= General glut =

Excess of supply in relation to demand

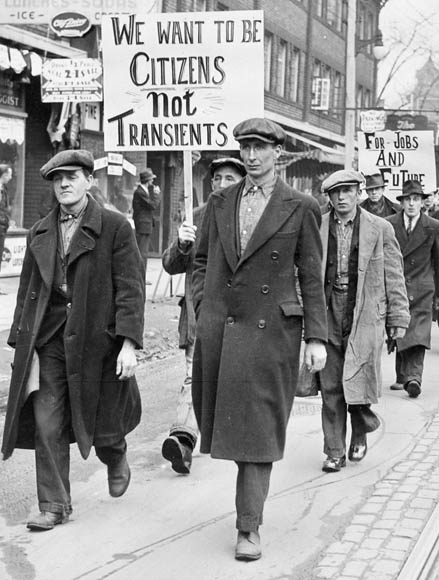
Unemployed men, marching for jobs during the Great Depression.

In macroeconomics, a general glut is an excess of supply in relation to demand; specifically, when there is more production in all fields of production in comparison with what resources are available to consume (purchase) said production. This exhibits itself in a general recession or depression, with high and persistent underutilization of resources, notably unemployment and idle factories. The Great Depression is often cited as an archetypal example of a general glut.

The term dates to the beginnings of classical economics in the late 18th century, and there is a long-running debate on the existence, causes, and solutions of a general glut. Some classical and neoclassical economists argue that there are no general gluts, advocating a form of Say's law (conventionally but controversially phrased as "supply creates its own demand"), and that any idling is due to misallocation of resources between sectors, not overall, because overproduction in one sector necessitates underproduction in others, as is demonstrable in severe price falls when such alleged 'malinvestment' in gluts clear; unemployment is seen as voluntary, or a transient phenomenon as the economy adjusts. Others cite the frequent and recurrent economic crises of the economic cycle as examples of a general glut, propose various causes and advocate various solutions, most commonly fiscal stimulus (government deficit spending), a view advocated in the 19th and early 20th century by underconsumptionist economists, and in the mid to late 20th and 21st century by Keynesian economics and related schools of economic thought.

One can distinguish between those who see a general glut (greater supply than demand) as a supply-side issue, calling it overproduction (excess production), and those who see it as a demand-side issue, calling it underconsumption (deficient consumption). Some believe that both of these occur, such as Jean Charles Léonard de Sismondi, one of the earliest modern theorists of the economic cycle.

== Classical economic theory ==
=== Introduction ===
The general glut problem is identified within the classical political economy of the era of Adam Smith and David Ricardo. The problem is that, as labor becomes specialized, if people want a higher standard of living, they must produce more. However, producing more lowers prices and leads to the need to produce yet more in response. If those who have money choose not to spend it, then it is possible for a national economy to become glutted with all of the goods it produces, and still be producing more in hopes of overcoming the deficit. While Say's law supposedly dealt with this problem, successive economists came up with new scenarios which could throw an economy out of general equilibrium, or require expansion through conquest, which became termed imperialism.

=== The nature of the general glut ===
In Classical Economics, the chief economic concern of all economists according to Thomas Sowell (On Classical Economics, 2006, pp. 22) was how to generate and sustain stable economic growth on a national level. Each factory-producer's basic concern is of maximizing return on investment through sales. Yet, concern was also expressed that savings (and not spending money by the wealthy classes) or production of the wrong items contrary to market demand would produce a nationwide economic glut (a.k.a. recession/depression) because of the un-purchased (unconsumed) products which result in unemployment, idle factories, low national output, and wealth fleeting from the nation. Some theorized that a general glut is then (in the basic case over time) avoidable and not inevitable. Say's law says, Since "savings equals investment" in a bank or other wise, money is always spent and ultimately reinvested into more or newer production activities which generates demand (both for the production resources and the items produced). Say's law: Since "demand is always present," then, "production generates its own demand." Then if a glut exists, producers must react to market demand liquidating glut items and produce the items the market desires. Demand will return and any remaining glut will then be distributed by the market. A company/country only needs to keep producing, or produce more wisely, or respond to market conditions with products that meet consumer's demands to avoid a (national recession/depression) glut.

=== Say's law ===
According to French economist Jean-Baptiste Say, the concentration of wealth into resources dedicated to savings and re-investment simply adds to the ability of consumption to consume more. And so, he states, there can be no general glut because investment in "production creates its own demand." A producer/country only need liquidate the glut items and redirect its production activities to items the market demands to eliminate the glut and prosperity will return.

=== Malthus's solution ===
Thomas Malthus proposed that a glut of production localised in time rather than by industry or field of production would meet the requirement of Say's law that general gluts cannot exist and yet would constitute just such a general glut. The consequences then are worked out by Malthus, although Simond de Sismondi first proposed this problem before him. Malthus is more famous for his earlier writings which tried to prove the opposite problem, a general over-consumption, as an inevitability to be lived with rather than solved.

== Keynesian ==
Keynesian economics, and under consumptionism before it, argue that fiscal stimulus in the form of government deficit spending can solve general gluts.

This is a demand side theory, rather than the supply-side theory of classical economics; the fundamental ideas are that savings in a recession or depression causes the paradox of thrift (excess saving, or more pejoratively, "hoarding"), causing a deficit of effective demand, yielding a general glut. Keynes locates the cause in sticky wages and liquidity preference.

To resolve a general glut, Keynesians advocate for counter-cyclical fiscal policy, where the government uses deficit spending to supplement demand until private sector confidence is restored.

== Marxian ==
Karl Marx's critique of Malthus started from a position of agreement. Marx's idea of capitalist production, however, is characterized by his concentration on the division of labor and his notion that goods are produced for sale and not for consumption or exchange. In other words, goods are produced simply for the intention of transforming output into money. The possibility of a lack of effective demand, therefore, is held only in the possibility that there might be a time lag between the sale of a commodity (the acquisition of money) and the purchase of another (its disbursement). This possibility, also originally crafted by Sismondi (1819), endorsed the idea that the circularity of transactions was not always complete and immediate. If money is held, Marx contended, even if for a little while, there is a breakdown in the exchange process and a general glut can occur.

For Marx, since investment is part of aggregate demand, and the stimulus for investment is profitability, accumulation will continue unhindered as far as profitability is high. However, Marx saw that profitability had a tendency to fall, which would lead to a crisis in which insufficient investment generates an insufficiency of demand and a glut of markets. The crisis itself would operate to raise profitability, which would start a new period of accumulation. This would be the mechanism for crisis occurring repeatedly.

== Post-Keynesian ==
Some Post-Keynesian economists see the cause of general gluts in the bursting of credit bubbles, particularly speculative bubbles. In this view, the cause of a general glut is the shift from private sector deficit spending to private sector savings, as in the debt-deflation hypothesis of Irving Fisher and the Financial Instability Hypothesis of Hyman Minsky, and locate the paradox of thrift in paying down debt. The shift from spending more than one earns to spending less than one earns (in the aggregate) causes a sustained drop in effective demand, and hence a general glut.

== Austrian ==
Austrian economics do not see "general glut" as a meaningful way of describing an economy, indeed Austrian Economists do not believe it is possible to have too much of everything. In the Austrian analysis, it is the misallocation of resources that should be avoided. Producing too much of the wrong things, and not enough of the right things, is what Austrians believe to be truly wrong with an economy

According to the Austrian Business Cycle Theory, artificially low interest rates (caused by central bank intervention) mislead entrepreneurs into investing in "higher-order" capital goods (long-term projects) for which there is no real consumer saving to support. Austrians argue against stimulus, claiming that government spending prevents the necessary liquidation of bad investments. They advocate for allowing prices and wages to fall to reflect actual market conditions, which will naturallyl clear the excess supply.

== See also ==
- Deflation
- Depression (economics)
- Overproduction
- Underconsumption
