= Overproduction =

Excess of supply over demand of products being offered to an economic market

In economics, overproduction, oversupply, excess of supply, or glut refers to excess of supply over demand of products being offered to the market. This leads to lower prices and/or unsold goods along with the possibility of unemployment.

The demand side equivalent is underconsumption; some consider supply and demand two sides to the same coin – excess supply is only relative to a given demand, and insufficient demand is only relative to a given supply – and thus consider overproduction and underconsumption equivalent.

In lean thinking, overproduction of goods or goods in process is seen as one of the seven wastes (Japanese term: muda) which do not add value to a product, and is considered "the most serious" of the seven.

Overproduction is often attributed to previous overinvestment – creation of excess productive capacity, which must then either lie idle (or under capacity), which is unprofitable, or produce an excess supply.

== Explanation ==
Overproduction is the accumulation of unsaleable inventories in the hands of businesses. Overproduction is a relative measure, referring to the excess of production over consumption. The tendency for an overproduction of commodities to lead to economic collapse is specific to the capitalist economy. In previous economic formations, an abundance of production created general prosperity. However, in the capitalist economy, commodities are produced for monetary profit. This so-called profit motive, the core of the capitalist economy, creates a dynamic whereby an abundance of commodities has negative consequences. In essence, an abundance of commodities disrupts the conditions for the creation of profit.

The overproduction of commodities forces businesses to reduce production in order to clear inventories. Any reduction in production implies a reduction in employment. A reduction in employment, in turn, reduces consumption. As overproduction is the excess of production above consumption, this reduction in consumption worsens the problem. This creates a "feed-back loop" or "vicious cycle", whereby excess inventories force businesses to reduce production, thereby reducing employment, which in turn reduces the demand for the excess inventories. The general reduction in the level of prices (deflation) caused by the law of supply and demand also forces businesses to reduce production as profits decline. Reduced profits render certain fields of production unprofitable.

Henry George argued that there could not be any such thing as overproduction in a general sense, but only in a relative sense:

Is there, then, such a thing as overproduction? Manifestly, there cannot be, in any general sense, until more wealth is produced than is wanted. In any unqualified sense, over- production is preposterous, when everywhere the struggle to get wealth is so intense; when so many must worry and strain to get a living, and there is actual want among large classes. The manner in which the strain of the war was borne shows how great are the forces of production which, in normal times, go to waste; proves that what we suffer from now is not overproduction, but underproduction.

Relative overproduction there, of course, may be. The desires for different forms of wealth vary in intensity and in sequence, and are related one with another. I may want both a pair of shoes and a dozen pocket-handkerchiefs, but my desire for the shoes is first and strongest; and upon the terms on which I can get the shoes may in large measure depend my ability to get the handkerchiefs. So, in the aggregate demand for the different forms of wealth, there is a similar relation. And as, under the division of labor characteristic of the modern industrial system, nearly all production is carried on with the view, not of consumption by the immediate producers, but of exchange for other productions, certain commodities may be produced so far in excess of their proper proportion to the production of other commodities, that the whole quantity produced cannot be exchanged for enough of those other commodities to give the usual returns to the capital and labor engaged in bringing them to market. This disproportionate production of some things, which is overproduction in relation to the production of other things, is the only kind of overproduction that can take place on any considerable scale, and the overproduction of which we hear so much is evidently of this character.

== Inevitability ==
Karl Marx outlined the inherent tendency of capitalism towards overproduction in his seminal work Das Kapital.

According to Marx, in capitalism, improvements in technology and rising levels of productivity increase the amount of material wealth (or use values) in society while simultaneously diminishing the economic value of this wealth, thereby lowering the rate of profit—a tendency that leads to the paradox, characteristic of crises in capitalism, of "reserve army of labour" and of “poverty in the midst of plenty”, or more precisely, crises of overproduction in the midst of underconsumption.

John Maynard Keynes formulated a theory of overproduction, which led him to propose government intervention to ensure effective demand. Effective demand are levels of consumption that corresponds to the level of production. If effective demand is achieved then there is no overproduction because all inventories are sold. Importantly, Keynes acknowledged that such measures could only delay and not solve overproduction.

== Say's law ==
Say's law states that "The more goods [for which there is demand] that are produced, the more those goods (supply) can constitute a demand for other goods". Keynes summarized this "law" as asserting that "supply creates its own demand". The consumer's desire to trade causes the potential consumer to become a producer to create goods that can be exchanged for the goods of others, goods are directly or indirectly exchanged for other goods. Because goods can only be paid for by other goods, no demand can exist without prior production. Following Say's law, overproduction (in the economy as a whole, specific goods can still be overproduced) is only possible in a limited sense.

== Environmental impact ==
Overproduction raises issues about the disposal of excess product stocks, which may have a significant environmental impact as well as raising additional waste disposal costs. More raw materials than necessary will have been used in production and, in some production processes, more undesirable pollution may have arisen due to the excess level of productive activity.

== See also ==
- Demand shortfall – When the actual benefits of a venture are less than the projected or estimated benefits
- Underconsumption – Economic stagnation from inadequate consumer demand
- Common Agricultural Policy – Agricultural policy of the European Union
- Resource exploitation – Use of natural resources for economic growth
- Overdrafting – Unsustainable extraction of groundwater
- Overfishing – Removal of any species of fish from water at a rate that the species cannot replenish
- Overgrazing – When plants are grazed for extended periods without sufficient recovery time
- Price stability – Monetary policy
- Lean manufacturing – Methodology used to improve production
