= Supply creates its own demand =

Maxim in economics

"Supply creates its own demand" is a formulation of Say's law. The rejection of this doctrine is a central component of The General Theory of Employment, Interest and Money (1936) and a central tenet of Keynesian economics. See Principle of effective demand, which is an affirmative form of the negation of Say's law.

Keynes's rejection of Say's law has on the whole been accepted within mainstream economics since the 1940s and 1950s in the neoclassical synthesis, but debate continues between Keynesian economists and neoclassical economists (see saltwater and freshwater economics).

Keynes's interpretation is rejected by many economists as a misinterpretation or caricature of Say's law — see Say's law: Keynes vs. Say — and the advocacy of the phrase "supply creates its own demand" is today most associated with supply-side economics, which retorts that "Keynes turned Say on his head and instead stated that 'demand creates its own supply'".

The exact phrase "supply creates its own demand" does not appear to be found in the writings of classical economists; similar sentiments, though different wordings, appear in the work of John Stuart Mill (1848), whom Keynes credits and quotes, and his father, James Mill (1808), whom Keynes does not. See for more detailed information Kates (1998) Say's Law and the Keynesian Revolution: How Macroeconomic Theory Lost its Way..

== Other sources ==
Another source widely cited as a classical expression of the idea, and the original statement of Say's law in English, is by James Mill, in Commerce Defended (1808):

The production of commodities creates, and is the one and universal cause that creates a market for the commodities produced.

— James Mill, Commerce Defended (1808), Chapter VI: Consumption, p. 81

Keynes does not cite a specific source for the phrase, and, as it does not appear to be found in the pre-Keynesian literature, some consider its ultimate origin a "mystery". The phrase "supply creates its own demand" appears earlier, in quotes, in a 1934 letter of Keynes, and has been suggested that the phrase was an oral tradition at Cambridge, in the circle of Joan Robinson, and that it may have derived from the following 1844 formulation by John Stuart Mill:

Nothing is more true than that it is produce which constitutes the market for produce, and that every increase of production, if distributed without miscalculation among all kinds of produce in the proportion which private interest would dictate, creates, or rather constitutes, its own demand.

— John Stuart Mill, Essays On Some Unsettled Questions of Political Economy (1844), "Of the Influence of Consumption On Production", p. 73

== Bibliography ==
- Clower, Robert W. (22 April 2004). "5: Trashing J.B. Say: The Story of a Mare's Nest". In Velupillai, K. Vela (ed.). Macroeconomic Theory and Economic Policy: Essays in Honour of Jean-Paul Fitoussi. Routledge. ISBN 978-0-203-35650-0.
