= Movement conservatism =

Inside term for the American New Right

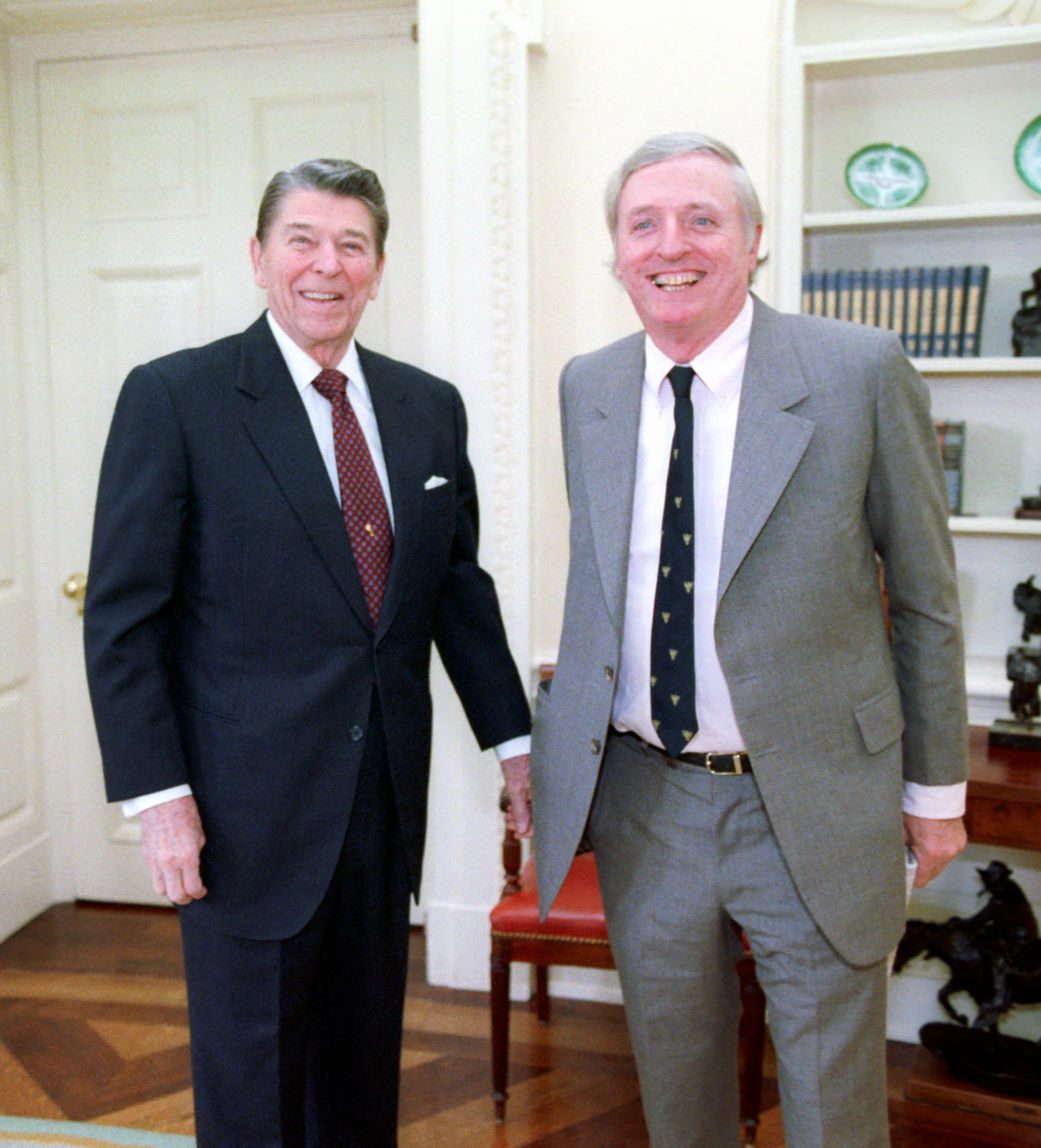
President Ronald Reagan (left) and editor William F. Buckley Jr. (right) were dominant leaders of the movement from the 1950s to the 1980s.

Movement conservatism is a term used by political analysts to describe conservatives in the United States since the mid-20th century and the New Right. According to George H. Nash in 2009, the movement comprises a coalition of five distinct impulses. From the mid-1930s to the 1960s, libertarians, traditionalists, and anti-communists made up this coalition, with the goal of fighting the liberals' New Deal.

In the 1970s, two more impulses were added with the addition of neoconservatives and the religious right. Emmett Tyrrell, a right-wing writer, says, "the conservatism that, when it made its appearance in the early 1950s, was called the New Conservatism and for the past fifty or sixty years has been known as 'movement conservatism' by those of us who have espoused it." Political scientists Doss and Roberts say that "The term movement conservatives refers to those people who argue that big government constitutes the most serious problem.... Movement conservatives blame the growth of the administrative state for destroying individual initiative." Historian Allan J. Lichtman traces the term to a memorandum written in February 1961 by William A. Rusher, the publisher of National Review, to William F. Buckley Jr., envisioning National Review as not just "the intellectual leader of the American Right," but more grandly of "the Western Right." Rusher envisioned philosopher kings would function as "movement conservatives".

Recent examples of writers using the term "movement conservatism" include Sam Tanenhaus, leading paleoconservative Paul Gottfried, and Jonathan Riehl. New York Times columnist Paul Krugman devoted a chapter of his book The Conscience of a Liberal (2007) to the movement, writing that movement conservatives gained control of the Republican Party starting in the 1970s and that Ronald Reagan was the first movement conservative elected president.

== History ==
Journalist John Judis writes that before William F. Buckley established the journal National Review in 1955, anti-leftist forces varied "from free market anti-New Dealers to traditionalists like Russell Kirk to anti-Semitic crackpots like Gerald L. K. Smith". Buckley "knit together" the strands he thought respectable and boycotted "kooks" and others he thought would hurt conservatism.

Paul Krugman described the rise of movement conservatism in his 2007 book The Conscience of a Liberal as occurring in several phases between 1950 and Reagan's election as president in 1980. These phases included building a conceptual base, a popular base, a business base, and an institutional infrastructure of think tanks. By the 2000s, movement conservatives had substantial control over the Republican Party.

=== Conceptual base ===
Author and magazine editor William F. Buckley Jr. was one of the founding members of the movement. His 1951 book God and Man at Yale argued against Keynesian economics, progressive taxation and the welfare state and gave him a national audience. In 1955, he founded National Review, which provided a platform for arguing the movement conservative viewpoint. His emphasis was on an anti-Communist foreign policy and a pro-business, anti-union domestic policy. However, in its early days the magazine also included sentiments of white supremacy. In the August 24, 1957 issue, Buckley's editorial "Why the South Must Prevail" spoke out explicitly in favor of segregation in the South. It argued that "the central question that emerges... is whether the White community in the South is entitled to take such measures as are necessary to prevail, politically and culturally, in areas where it does not predominate numerically? The sobering answer is Yes – the White community is so entitled because, for the time being, it is the advanced race." When Buckley ran for mayor of New York in 1965, he may have been the first conservative to endorse affirmative action, or, as he called it, “the kind of special treatment [of African Americans] that might make up for centuries of oppression.” He also promised to crack down on labor unions that discriminated against minorities, a cause even his liberal opponents were unwilling to embrace. Buckley pointed out the inherent unfairness in the administration of drug laws and in judicial sentencing. He also advanced a welfare “reform” plan whose major components were job training, education and daycare.

In 1969, in his capacity as founding editor of National Review, launched a decade and a half earlier as a “conservative weekly journal of opinion” that stood in opposition to the dominant liberal ethos of the time, Buckley toured African-American neighborhoods in Cleveland, Detroit, Chicago, San Francisco, Oakland, Los Angeles and Atlanta organized by the Urban League and afterward singled out for special praise “community organizers” who were working “in straightforward social work in the ghettos.” In an article in Look magazine months later, Buckley anticipated that the United States could well elect an African-American president within a decade, and that this milestone would confer the same reassurance and social distinction upon African Americans that Roman Catholics had felt upon the election of John F. Kennedy. That, he said, would be “welcome tonic” for the American soul. This Buckley, who emerged in the years after 1965, bore little resemblance to the one who, eight years earlier in 1957, had penned "Why the South Must Prevail".

The movement also gathered support from such disparate sources as libertarian Monetarists like economist Milton Friedman and neoconservatives like Irving Kristol. Friedman attacked government intervention and regulation in the 1950s and thereafter. Other free market economists began rejecting the expansion of the welfare state embodied in President Franklin D. Roosevelt's New Deal. Friedman also associated himself with the 1964 presidential campaign of Barry Goldwater, the first time a movement conservative ran for president, unsuccessfully in this case. Irving Kristol and the magazine The Public Interest were another source of intellectual direction for the movement. During the 1960s, Kristol and his associates argued against the Great Society policies of President Lyndon B. Johnson, which had expanded the welfare state through Medicare and the War on Poverty.

=== Popular base ===
Robert W. Welch Jr. founded the John Birch Society in 1958 as a secret grass-roots group to fight Communists, who Welch said controlled much of the American establishment, and whose agents included even Eisenhower himself. Welch used the dues to build an elaborate organizational infrastructure that enabled him to keep a very tight rein on the chapters. Its main activity in the 1960s, says Rick Perlstein, "comprised monthly meetings to watch a film by Welch, followed by writing postcards or letters to government officials linking specific policies to the Communist menace". After its quick rise in membership William F. Buckley, Jr. and National Review mobilized movement conservatives, including Goldwater himself, to denounce the John Birch Society as an extremist fringe element of the conservative movement.

In support of Goldwater in 1964, Reagan delivers the TV address, "A Time for Choosing", launching him to national prominence in politics

Ronald Reagan was a key figure in expanding the popularity of movement conservatism from intellectual circles into the popular mainstream, by emphasizing the dangers of an excessively large federal government. In October 1964, Reagan delivered a speech as part of his support for candidate Goldwater titled "A Time for Choosing". The speech represented the ideology of movement conservatism, arguing against big government bureaucracy and welfare while also denouncing foreign aid. The speech was widely applauded and gave Reagan a national audience. He was elected Governor of California in 1966 and 1970.

In the wake of civil rights legislation passed in 1964 and 1968, many white southern Democrats began shifting to the Republican Party. This ended the exceptionalism of the "one-party South" in presidential elections and brought significant additional political power to the Republican Party, although these voters were not necessarily movement conservatives. In 1994, for the first time the Republicans controlled the majority of the house seats from the South, and by 2014 had gained a virtual monopoly of state and national offices throughout most of the South.

=== Business base ===
Movement conservatives embraced an anti-regulation and anti-union message as part of their appeal to business interests, with whom they had common ground in terms of tax policy. For example, in 1958 Barry Goldwater referred to influential union leader Walter Reuther as a "more dangerous menace than the Sputnik or anything Soviet Russia might do to America." While unions had a strong presence in major northern manufacturing industries, many southern and western states had significantly less union presence, and many business leaders wanted them to remain that way.

=== Institutional infrastructure ===
In the late 1960s and 1970s, movement conservatives persuaded wealthy individuals and businesses to establish a conservative intellectual and political infrastructure. This includes think tanks that resemble academic institutions but publish studies supporting conservative and libertarian arguments. The American Enterprise Institute was founded in 1943, but was expanded dramatically with new funding in 1971. The Heritage Foundation was created in 1973, and the Cato Institute was founded in 1974.

== Impact of the movement ==
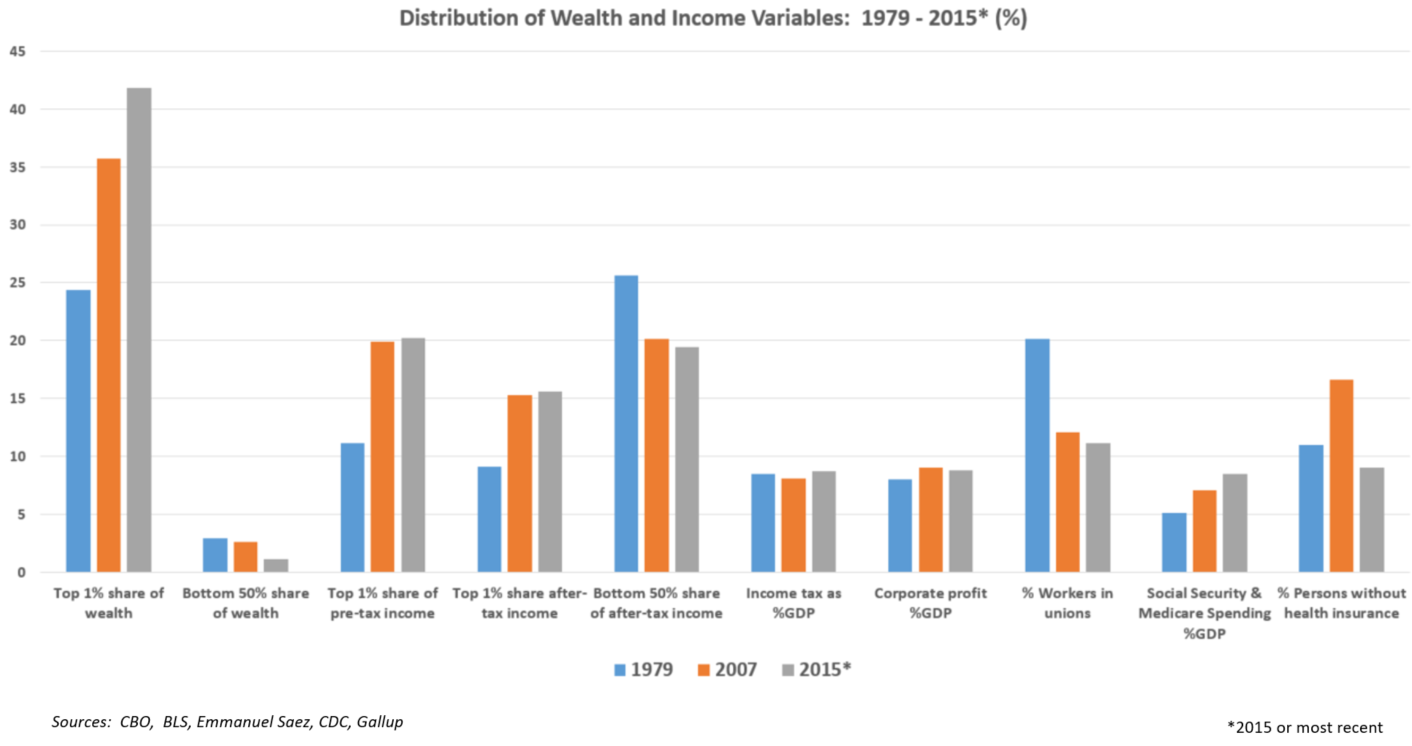
Selected economic variables related to wealth and income equality, comparing 1979, 2007, and 2015.

According to Krugman, movement conservatives drove America's shift to the political right in the 1970s and 1980s and "empowered businesses to confront and, to a large extent, crush the union movement, with huge consequences for both [increasing] wage inequality and the political balance of power." Union representation nationally in the U.S. declined from over 30% in the 1950s to 12% by the early 2000s. Fareed Zakaria stated in November 2016 in describing a book about conservative Alan Greenspan: "It's also a vivid portrait of the American establishment as it moved right from the 1970's to the 1980s and 1990s."

== Political roles ==
Scholars have traced the political role of movement conservatives in recent decades. Political scientist Robert C. Smith reports that in the 1960 presidential election, "While movement conservatives supported Nixon against Kennedy, the support was half-hearted." Smith notes that National Review, edited by William F. Buckley Jr., called Nixon the lesser of two evils.

Historian William Link, in his biography of Jesse Helms, reports that "By the mid-1970s, these movement conservatives wanted to control the Republican Party and, ultimately, the national government."

Phyllis Schlafly, who mobilized conservative women for Reagan, boasted after the 1980 election that Reagan won by riding "the rising tides of the Pro-Family Movement and the Conservative Movement. Reagan articulated what those two separate movements want from government, and therefore he harnessed their support and rode them into the White House."

However, movement conservatives had to compete for President Reagan's attention with fiscal conservatives, businessmen, and traditionalists. Nash (2009) identifies a tension between middle-of-the-road republicans and "movement conservatives." Conservative historian Steven Hayward says, "Movement conservatives bristled at seeing the GOP establishment so well represented in Reagan's inner circle", and they did not realize how well this arrangement actually served Reagan.

To sabotage movement plans, the fiscal conservatives sometimes would leak movement conservatives' plans to the press.

New Left historian Todd Gitlin finds that, "movement conservatives of a religious bent had to be willing to accept a long-term strategy for limiting abortion (via legislation banning partial-birth abortion, and certain statewide bans), rather than go for broke with a probably doomed constitutional amendment."

== Movement conservative publications and institutes ==
- American Enterprise Institute
- The American Spectator magazine, a conservative political magazine
- City Journal, official publication of the Manhattan Institute
- First Things, magazine on religion
- FreedomWorks, a conservative activist group
- The Heritage Foundation, a conservative think tank
- Humanitas, a traditionalist conservative publication
- Independence Institute, a conservative think tank
- Intercollegiate Studies Institute, a traditionalist conservative academic organization
- Leadership Institute, an organization for conservative activists
- Manhattan Institute for Policy Research
- Media Research Center, conservative organization which monitors and reports on liberal media bias
- Modern Age, a traditionalist conservative intellectual journal
- National Review magazine, a conservative political magazine; founded in 1955 by William F. Buckley, Jr.
- Policy Review magazine, a conservative academic magazine
- Project for a New American Century, a neoconservative think tank
- Townhall.com, conservative news, information, and commentary

== See also ==
- Timeline of modern American conservatism
