= The Occupy Handbook =

2012 book edited by Janet Byrne

- Language: English
- Genre: Nonfiction
- Publisher: Back Bay Books
- Publication date: 2012
- Publication place: United States
- Media type: Print (Paperback)
- Pages: 560
- ISBN: 978-0316220217

The Occupy Handbook is a collection of essays about Occupy Wall Street as well as the larger international Occupy movement. Contributors include economists and political commentators such as: Paul Krugman, Robin Wells, Michael Lewis, Robert Reich, Amy Goodman, David Graeber, Peter Diamond, Emmanuel Saez, Ariel Dorfman, Barbara Ehrenreich, Jeff Sachs, and Nouriel Roubini, among others. The essays analyze the movement's origins and questions about the role of the movement in contemporary society. The book attempts to capture the Occupy Wall Street phenomenon, giving readers an on-the-scene feel for the movement, as well as considering the lasting changes wrought and recommending reform. The editor of The Occupy Handbook, Janet Byrne, has previously written about the Occupy movement for the Huffington Post.

Writing for the New Yorker magazine, John Cassidy writes, "I thoroughly recommend The Occupy Handbook." Kirkus Reviews describes it as "A succinct body of essays by knowledgeable, sympathetic observers on the grievances of the Occupy Wall Street protestors." John Gapper of the Financial Times calls it, "A rewarding collection of essays on the meaning of Occupy Wall Street concentrates its ire on the US political system".
