= The Conscience of a Conservative =

1960 book by Barry Goldwater and L. Brent Bozell Jr.

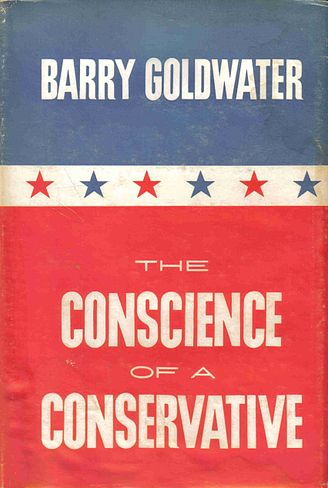
- Cover of the first edition
- Author: Barry Goldwater (nominal); L. Brent Bozell Jr. (ghostwriter)
- Language: English
- Subject: Politics, American conservatism
- Publisher: Victor Publishing Co.
- Publication date: 1960
- Publication place: United States
- Media type: Print
- Pages: 123
- ISBN: 9780691131177
- OCLC: 1002492
- Dewey Decimal: 320.520973
- LC Class: JK271 .G668

The Conscience of a Conservative is a 1960 book published under the name of Arizona Senator Barry Goldwater who was the 1964 Republican presidential candidate. It helped revive the American conservative movement and make Goldwater a political star, and it has influenced countless conservatives in the United States, helping to lay the foundation for the Reagan Revolution of the 1980s.

The book was largely ghostwritten by L. Brent Bozell Jr., brother-in-law of William F. Buckley Jr. Bozell and Buckley had been members of Yale's debate team. They had co-authored the controversial book, McCarthy and His Enemies, in 1955. Bozell had been Goldwater's speechwriter in the 1950s and was familiar with many of his ideals.

== Content ==
The 123-page book covers such topics as education, labor unions and policies, civil rights, agricultural policy and farm subsidies, social welfare programs, and income taxation. The book is considered to be a significant statement of politically and economically American conservative ideas which were to gain influence during the following decades.

In his book, Goldwater states explicitly that there are "laws of God" and "truths of God" which inform his concept of 'conservatism' and under which the US should operate.

== Later editions ==
A half-century edition, edited by C.C. Goldwater (his granddaughter), with a foreword by George Will, and an afterword by Robert F. Kennedy Jr, was published by the Princeton University Press in 2007.

== Namesake books ==
The book, and its title, continue to inspire contemporary political commentary, such as:

- Mayer Schiller (1978), The (Guilty) Conscience of a Conservative
- Krugman, Paul (2007). The Conscience of a Liberal. New York: W.W. Norton & Co.
- Zell Miller (2003), A National Party No More: The Conscience of a Conservative Democrat
- Wayne Allyn Root (2009), The Conscience of a Libertarian: Empowering the Citizen Revolution with God, Guns, Gambling & Tax Cuts.
- Gary Chartier (2011), The Conscience of an Anarchist: Why It's Time to Say Good-Bye to the State and Build a Free Society
- Jeff Flake (2017), Conscience of a Conservative: A Rejection of Destructive Politics and a Return to Principle
- Steven J. Klees (2020). The conscience of a progressive. Winchester: Zero Books.
- Wellstone, Paul David (2002). The Conscience of a Liberal: Reclaiming the Compassionate Agenda. U of Minnesota Press. ISBN 978-0-8166-4179-6.
