= Robin Wells =

American economist

Robin Elizabeth Wells
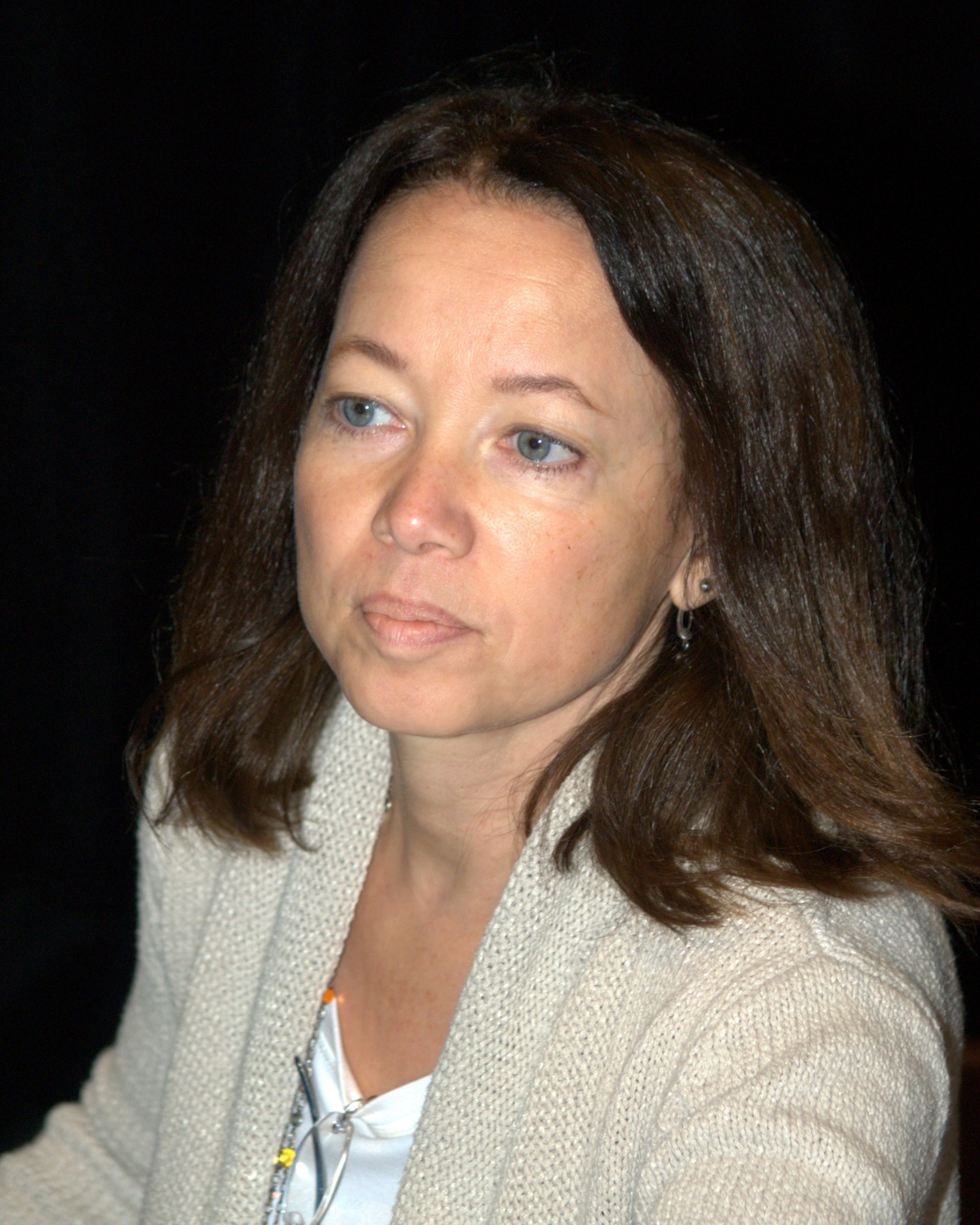
- Wells in 2010
- Born: 1959 (age 66–67)
- Spouse: Paul Krugman

Academic background
- Education: University of Chicago (BA); University of California, Berkeley (PhD)

Academic work
- Discipline: International finance; Contract theory
- Institutions: Stanford Graduate School of Business; MIT Department of Economics; Princeton University Department of Economics

Robin Elizabeth Wells (born 1959) is an American economist. She is the co-author of several economics texts, mostly with her husband Paul Krugman.

== Life and career ==
Wells received her BA from the University of Chicago and her PhD from the University of California, Berkeley. Wells did a post-doctoral fellowship at the Massachusetts Institute of Technology. She has taught or done research at the University of Michigan, the University of Southampton, Stanford University, MIT, and Princeton University.

Wells and her husband, economist Paul Krugman, wrote several economics texts together. For The Occupy Handbook, Wells served as guest editor and contributed an original article. She is a frequent writer for The Guardian online, has published articles in economics journals, and has blogged for The Huffington Post. With her husband, she has co-authored articles and book reviews for The New York Review of Books. Wells teaches Forrest Yoga in Princeton, New Jersey.

== Selected bibliography ==
- Economics: European Edition (Spring 2007), Paul Krugman, Robin Wells, and Kathryn Graddy. ISBN 0-7167-9956-1
- Macroeconomics (February 2006), Paul Krugman and Robin Wells. ISBN 0-7167-6763-5
- Economics (December 2005), Paul Krugman and Robin Wells. ISBN 1-57259-150-1
- Microeconomics (March 2004), Paul Krugman and Robin Wells. ISBN 0-7167-5997-7
- The Occupy Handbook (April 2012), edited by Janet Byrne. ISBN 0-3162-2021-3
