= The Great Unraveling =

2003 book by Paul Krugman

The Great Unraveling: Losing Our Way in the New Century
- The Great Unraveling cover
- Author: Paul Krugman
- Language: English
- Subject: US economy in the early 2000s
- Genre: Non-fiction
- Publisher: W. W. Norton
- Publication date: August 17, 2003
- Publication place: United States
- Media type: Print, e-book
- Pages: 426 pp
- ISBN: 978-0393058505

The Great Unraveling: Losing Our Way in the New Century is a book by American economist and Nobel laureate Paul Krugman, consisting of a collection of his columns for The New York Times (and some for Slate and Fortune). The collected columns were concerned mainly with the U.S. economy in the early 2000s, and about the economic and foreign policies of the George W. Bush administration.

The book was third on the New York Times Best Seller list for the week of October 5, 2003, and remained on the best-seller list for eight weeks. It was listed as one of the 'notable books' of 2003 by The New York Times.

== Main themes ==
Taken as a whole, the columns were a scathing criticism of the Bush administration, and the Republican party at that time. Krugman argued that the large deficits during that time were generated by the Bush administration as a result of decreasing taxes on the rich, increasing public spending, and fighting the Iraq War. Krugman wrote that these policies were unsustainable in the long run and would eventually generate a major economic crisis.
