= Strategic trade theory =

Strategic trade theory (sometimes appearing in literature as "strategic trade policy") describes the policy certain countries adopt in order to affect the outcome of strategic interactions between firms in an international oligopoly, an industry dominated by a small number of firms. The term ‘strategic’ in this context refers to the strategic interaction between firms; it does not refer to military objectives or importance of a specific industry.

The main idea in this theory is that trade policies can raise the level of domestic welfare in a given state by shifting profits from foreign to domestic firms. Strategic use of export subsidies, import tariffs and subsidies to R&D or investment for firms facing global competition can have strategic effects to their development in the international market. Since intervention by more than one government can lead to cases resembling the Prisoner’s dilemma, the theory emphasizes the importance of trade agreements that restrict such interventions.

== History ==
International trade policy is one of the most ancient subject areas in economics, having generated serious debates at least since the classical period of ancient Greece, over two thousands years ago.

An important paper on this topic containing actual case studies was written by Professors Helen Milner and David Yoffie in 1989. According to the authors, increasing numbers of multinational firms that historically supported unilaterally opening their home market have publicly advocated a third type of policy—a “strategic” trade policy of demanding trade barriers for the home market if foreign markets are protected.

Two papers often cited as having critical contributions to strategic trade policy (or theory) are by Spencer and Brander, one from 1983 and the other from 1985. Both papers picture an international duopoly in which a domestic and a foreign firm compete in a third-country market where the market is in a state of oligopoly. In their first article, Spencer and Brander develop a three-stage game: in the first stage, a subsidy to R&D (or combination of R&D tax and an export subsidy) can increase domestic welfare by shifting profits from the foreign to the domestic firm; in the second stage, the R&D subsidy makes it credible for the domestic firm to commit to a higher level of R&D; finally, the foreign firm is motivated to reduce its R&D and exports.

Brander and Spencer's second article suggests a simpler two-stage game to emphasize the profit-shifting role of export subsidies in a more standard international trade setting.

The authors have an even earlier article (1981) which may in fact be the first application of strategic trade policy. The paper sets out cost conditions under which the domestic country can gain by increasing its import tariff. The tariff shifts profits from the foreign to the domestic firm.

== Essence of the theory ==
Governments can use trade policy instruments to shift profits from foreign to domestically owned firms, thereby raising national economic welfare at the expense of other countries. In practice, however, the impetus for government intervention is likely to come from a narrowly focused interest group that has a stake in a specific industry.

The standard model is set up as a two-stage game. In the initial stage, the home government is able to enact an export subsidy for the home firm’s output of the homogeneous product. In the second stage, the firm of each country chooses the quantity to produce and sell to the third country. Each firm takes the other’s output as given when maximizing profit. The subsidy lowers the home firm’s cost and makes it want to export more for any given export level of the rival. Since the home and foreign products are strategic substitutes, the foreign firm must reduce its output. As the domestic export subsidy increases, aggregate quantity rises, price falls, and the profits of the domestic firm rise while foreign profits decline. In effect, rents are shifted from the foreign firm to the home firm.

To make the model clearer let’s explore an example: two aircraft firms from two different countries are competing for the world market for commercial aircraft. The firm dominating in the world market for commercial aircraft captures the excess returns - profits greater than could be earned in equally risky investments in other sectors of the economy, and enjoys the higher “national” income. And because the commercial aircraft is an oligopolistic industry in which only a limited number of firms can operate, only a small number of countries can enjoy the available excess returns. Therefore, societies would compete over these industries. Strategic trade theory suggests that in some industries global economic interaction gives rise to zero-sum competition over the excess returns available in oligopolistic industries.

In the absence of intervention by any government, the firm that is the first to enter a particular industry will win and by doing so will deter entry by potential rivals. This “first mover advantage” will usually fall in the hands of economies of large scale and experience. The firm entered into the market first, has a production cost advantage over rivals who may want to enter the market later. As a consequence, the second firm that could compete in the market once it achieved large scale and experience of its own is deterred from entering the industry because the cost advantage enjoyed by the already established firm makes it very difficult to sell enough aircraft to reach the level of these economies.

Government intervention may have a powerful effect on the willingness of a later-comer to enter the industry. Targeted government intervention may enable late entrants to successfully challenge first movers. By doing so, government intervention shifts the excess returns available in a particular industry from a foreign country to the national economy. The logic of this argument can be illustrated using the Table 1:

		First State Firm
		Produce	Not Produce
Second State Firm	Produce	-5, -5	100, 0
	Not Produce	0, 100	0, 0

The numbers are used for visualization of possible units of profit.

Let's assume there are two firms, one from each state, interacting in a high-tech industry (commercial aircraft for example) which will support only one producer. Each firm has two possible strategies, to produce commercial aircraft or to not produce. The payoffs that each firm gains from the four possible outcomes are depicted in the table. There are also two possible outcomes: one in which the First State firm produces and the Second State firm does not, in this case the question which country captures the industry depends upon which firm is first to enter the market.

However, government intervention can help new firms enter an established high-technology industry in order to challenge and compete with already-established firms. There are several forms of assistance a government can give to these firms, such as financial assistance to help new firms to pay for the costs of research and development, subsidies, guarantee a market for the early and more expensive versions of the firms' products, using of tariffs and quotas to keep foreign goods out and favoring domestic products while making government purchasing decisions. The combination of financial support and guaranteed markets allows domestic firms to enter the market and compete in international market.

The impact of such policies on firms' production decisions can be seen in Table 2:

		First State Firm
		Produce	Not Produce
Second State Firm	Produce	-5, 5	100, 0
	Not Produce	0, 110	0, 0

Let's suppose that the Second State Firm was the first to enter and dominates the industry. Following this the First State government will provide for a subsidy of 10 units and the subsidy changes the payoffs of the firm. The subsidy therefore makes it rational for the First State Firm to start producing. Furthermore, because high-tech industries have an oligopolistic nature, they support only a small number of firms; the entry of new firms into the sector must cause other firms to exit. Thus, government policies that promote the creation of a successful industry in one country undermine the established industry in other countries.

To summarize, international competitiveness and the pattern of international specialization in high-technology industries are attributed as much to the timing of market entry as to underlying factor endowments.

According to Milner and Yoffie (1989), as industries require greater economies of scale or become subject to significant cumulative learning effects, they become more dependent upon access to foreign markets. If that access to world markets is impeded by foreign government protection or subsidies, domestic firms realize that their preferred policies will depend upon the choices of their foreign rivals. This interdependence will lead firms that formally advocated unconditional free trade to demand that free trade at home be contingent on reciprocal access to foreign markets.

== Criticism ==
Even though a state-centered approach directs our attention to the important role that states play in shaping the structure of their domestic economies, it does have some important weaknesses. A number of studies point out to some problematic issues of the strategic trade theory.

Horstmann and Markusen (1986) focus on assumptions regarding production technology. They suggest that subsidies and tariffs can promote entry by less efficient firms and raise the industry average cost. Dixit and Kyle (1985) argue that it is important to consider the question of who is behaving strategically with respect to whom. Potential responses such as government retaliation and changes to market structure are ignored in the Strategic Trade Theory.

Another critique focuses on the fact that one nation's citizens may own stock in both domestic and foreign firms. Thus the notion of a "domestic" firm is less meaningful in a world of international capital movements. Irwin (1996) argues that concern about international market share is a characteristic of mercantilism. Such a perspective views world trade as fixed and divided among a few countries.

A number of practical concerns make many observers skeptical of the theory's potential application. For example, national governments are unlikely to have the analytical capacity to determine the optimal form of trade intervention. Additionally, the national political process may compromise the government's ability to apply such policies. A government that shift rents from other exporters may invite retaliation in those or other markets.

Critics also argue that strategic trade policy cannot explain how domestic firms became research and development leaders in the absence of governmental assistance or how state-assisted industries failed. Strategic trade policy's results usually are visible after considerable time periods, sometimes longer than the electoral cycles. The successful implementation of the policy requires that the firms believe that state support will continue, irrespective of political changes.

== Competitive Theories ==
Free trade is a trade policy that allows traders to act and transact without interference from government. Under a free trade policy, prices are a reflection of true supply and demand, and are the sole determinant of resource allocation. Free trade differs from other forms of trade policy where the allocation of goods and services amongst trading countries are determined by artificial prices that may or may not reflect the true nature of supply and demand. These artificial prices are the result of protectionist trade policies, whereby governments intervene in the market through price adjustments and supply restrictions. Such government interventions can increase as well as decrease the cost of goods and services to both consumers and producers.

Protectionism is the economic policy of restraining trade between states, through methods such as tariffs on imported goods, restrictive quotas, and a variety of other government regulations designed to discourage imports, and prevent foreign take-over of native markets and companies. The main emphasis of this policy is the protection of the local economy and the interests of the state, regardless of the natural flow of the global market. This policy contrasts with free trade and is not entirely in line with strategic trade policy since the latter gives greater emphasis on the state's assistance to local firms in their entry into the global market.

== Sources ==
- Hart, Jeffrey A. and Aseem Prakash, "Strategic Trade and Investment Policies: Implications for the Study of International Political Economy", in International Political Economy: Perspectives on Global Power and Wealth, ed. By J.A. Frieden & D.A. Lake (Boston: Bedford/St. Martin's, 2000). ISBN 978-0-3939-3505-9
- Oatley, Thomas, International Political Economy: Interests and Institutions in the Global Economy (Harlow: Longman, 2008). ISBN 978-0205060634
- Reimer, Jeffrey J. and Kily W. Stiegert, "Evidence on Imperfect Competition and Strategic Trade Theory" in Staff Paper no. 498 (Madison, WI: University of Wisconsin-Madison, Department of Agricultural & Applied Economics, 2006)
- Spencer, Barbara and James A. Bredner, "Strategic Trade Policy", in The New Palgrave Dictionary of Economics, ed. by S.N. Durlauf and L. E. Blume (Basingstoke, Hampshire : Palgrave Macmillan, 2008). ISBN 978-0333786765
