= The Conscience of a Liberal =

2007 book by Paul Krugman

- The Conscience of a Liberal cover
- Author: Paul Krugman
- Language: English
- Subject: Modern liberalism
- Publisher: W. W. Norton
- Publication date: October 1, 2007
- Publication place: United States
- Media type: Print (Hardcover)
- Pages: 296 pp
- ISBN: 0-393-06069-1
- OCLC: 154706837
- Dewey Decimal: 339.2/20973 22
- LC Class: HC110.I5 K74 2007

The Conscience of a Liberal is a 2007 book written by economist and Nobel laureate Paul Krugman. It was 24th on the New York Times Best Seller list in November 2007. The title was used originally in Senator Paul Wellstone's book of the same name in 2001. Wellstone's title was a response to Barry Goldwater's 1960 book The Conscience of a Conservative. In the book, Krugman studies the past 80 years of American history in the context of economic inequality. A central theme is the reemergence of both economic and political inequality since the 1970s. Krugman analyzes the causes behind these events and proposes a "new New Deal" for America.

== Synopsis ==
The book is a history of wealth and income gaps in the US in the 20th century. The book documents that the gap between rich and poor diminished greatly in mid-century—he refers to this as the "Great Compression"—then widened again, starting in the 1980s, to levels higher than those in the 1920s. Most economists—including Krugman himself—have regarded the late 20th century divergence as resulting largely from changes in technology and trade, but now Krugman writes—particularly in Chapters 1, 3, and 4—that government policies—particularly the establishment of, and subsequent attacks on, the social safety net or "welfare state"—has played a much greater role both in reducing the gap in the 1930s through 1970s, and in widening it in the 1980s through the present.

He talks about the history of American conservatism, both, in Chapter 2, pre–New Deal conservatism—dominating the period between the American Civil War and the Great Depression (which he calls the "Long Gilded Age")—and, in Chapter 6, modern-day "movement conservatism". He argues—particularly in Chapters 5, 6, and 9—that the subtle exploitation by movement conservatives of racial and cultural resentments through small-government rhetoric (see "dog-whistle politics") and of national-security fears were key in the movement's ability to win national elections—even though its policies concentrating wealth at the top should be deeply unpopular. He talks extensively, in Chapter 6, about William F. Buckley, Jr.'s, Irving Kristol's and Ronald Reagan's role in building the movement—and, in Chapters 7 and 8, about the role of "institutions [particularly labor unions] and norms [particularly corporate policy]"—vis-à-vis government policy—in increasing or decreasing economic inequality. He rebukes the George W. Bush administration for policies that were currently widening the gap between the rich and poor.

Nevertheless, Krugman expresses optimism in Chapter 10 that demographic trends—particularly on race and culture—and what he sees as conservative overreach during the Bush years—are creating a new center-left political environment and are slowly undermining the conservative movement, referencing John Judis and Ruy Texeira's book, The Emerging Democratic Majority. Krugman proposes, in Chapters 11 and 12, that Democrats propose a "new New Deal", which includes placing more emphasis on social and medical programs—particularly universal health care—and less on national defense.

Finally, in Chapter 13, he talks about what it means to be a "liberal", about the rise in new progressive organizations—which, unlike conservative think tanks, publications and other organizations, are actually more de-centralized and independent-thinking—and how many more people appear to support "liberal" policies than are prepared to use that word to describe themselves. The book concludes with advice that, for the time being, liberals must be partisans until both major political parties accept the rationality of the New Deal.

== Reviews and critiques ==
The book received praise from outlets such as The New York Review of Books, and was criticized by conservative groups and the libertarian Ludwig von Mises Institute, who argued it was overly political and weak on economic content. In a review for The New York Times, Pulitzer Prize-winning historian David M. Kennedy stated: "Krugman's chapter on the imperative need for health care reform is the best in this book, a rueful reminder of the kind of skilled and accessible economic analysis of which he is capable, and how little of it is on display here. Like the rants of Rush Limbaugh or the films of Michael Moore, Krugman's shrill polemic may hearten the faithful, but it will do little to persuade the unconvinced or to advance the national discussion of the important issues it addresses."

== Related information ==
The Conscience of a Liberal is also the title of Krugman's economics and politics blog, hosted by The New York Times since 2005.

A paperback edition of The Conscience of a Liberal was released in January 2009.
