= Foster and Catchings =

Foster and Catchings refers to two American economists of the 1920s, William Trufant Foster and Waddill Catchings, who worked extensively together and hence are often referred to as a pair. The two met as undergraduate classmates at Harvard University. They were the leading pre-Keynesian economists, in the underconsumptionist tradition, advocating similar issues to John Maynard Keynes such as the paradox of thrift and economic interventionism.
