= E.B. Harris =

American businessman (1913–1993)

Everette Bagby Harris (April 18, 1913 - December 24, 1993) was an American businessman. Harris served as President of the Chicago Mercantile Exchange from 1953 to 1978. During this time, he oversaw the diversification of the products traded on the exchange. He was previously the secretary of the Chicago Board of Trade.

== Early life ==
Harris was born and raised on an 80-acre (0.32 km^{2}) farm near Norris, Illinois. As a teenager, he hitchhiked to Detroit, Michigan to find employment as a dockworker. He later returned to Illinois and attended the University of Illinois on an academic scholarship and studied economics. While attending the University of Illinois, Harris married fellow student Marguerite Solberg. Harris and Solberg later divorced, but remarried after Harris' second wife died.

== Early business career ==
After graduating in 1935, Harris initially worked in the advertising department of Southern Indiana Gas and Electric. He then worked for the U.S. Bureau of Labor Statistics during World War II. After the war he served as an economist for Mandel Bros. During this time he received a master's degree in economics from the University of Chicago Graduate School of Business. In 1949, Harris was hired as the secretary of The Chicago Board of Trade. Though the Board of Trade had a reputation for hiring Jewish traders, Harris stood out as a presbyterian.

== Chicago Mercantile Exchange ==
In 1953, the Chicago Mercantile Exchange hired Harris for the position of President and doubled the $10,000 salary he was paid by the Board of Trade. Harris then suggested that the two should merge, but this was not a popular idea at the Board of Trade so he moved to the Mercantile Exchange. At that time, the Mercantile Exchange was much smaller than the Board of Trade. While serving as president, Harris was the most public representative of the exchange. He served as president until retiring on his 65th birthday in 1978.

=== Onion futures scandal ===
At the time he was first hired, the most traded products on the Chicago Mercantile Exchange were futures and options on onions, followed by potatoes and eggs. In 1955 two onion traders, Sam Seigel and Vincent Kosuga cornered the onion futures market and then drove onion prices in order to profit from a short positions that they held. The collapse of onion prices drove many onion farmers into bankruptcy. A public outcry ensued among onion farmers who were left with large amounts of worthless inventory. Soon the Commodity Exchange Authority investigated and the Senate Committee on Agriculture held hearings on a proposed ban on onion futures trading. As the public face of the exchange, Harris lobbied hard against the bill. He described the proposed ban as "Burning down the barn to find a suspected rat". The measure was passed, however, and President Dwight D. Eisenhower signed the Onion Futures Act in August 1958.

=== Cattle trading ===
After the loss of the lucrative onion trading market, the Chicago Mercantile Exchange was brought to the brink of bankruptcy. In order to stay solvent, they began trading in pork bellies in 1962. Pork bellies proved to be a popular product and brought fresh growth as meat packing companies joined the exchange. At Harris' insistence, the exchange also began trading in live cattle in November 1964. Harris later described the introduction of live cattle trading as his "monument". Harris celebrated the beginning of live cattle trading by parading an Angus calf around the trading floor. Cattle trading later became one of the mainstay products of the exchange. The Chicago Board of Trade later began offering live cattle trading to compete with the Mercantile Exchange. Harris accused the Board of Trade of "violating an unwritten law of commodity trading" by offering the same product that was launched by a neighboring exchange. Though Harris circulated a public petition which demanded the Board of Trade cease copying the Mercantile Exchange, the Board of Trade continued trading in live cattle futures.

=== Currency trading ===
Although these proved to be profitable products for the exchange, Harris believed that the exchange was too dependent upon these two products. After he and Chicago Mercantile Exchange chairman Leo Melamed visited the International Commercial Exchange in New York City, they decided to introduce currency futures trading to the exchange. Harris and Melamed were initially worried about possible regulatory attention and their ability to draw customers to currency trading. They arranged a meeting with Milton Friedman to discuss the proposal. Friedman was enthusiastic about the idea and published an article in support. Harris and Melamed later met with then-United States Secretary of the Treasury George P. Shultz, who also approved of their plan. In 1972, they began trading currency on the exchange and it was a very successful market. The currency trading on the Chicago Mercantile Exchange eventually served as a model for many other currency trading markets.

== Bibliography ==
- Greising, David; Morse, Laurie (1991), Brokers, Bagmen, and Moles: Fraud and Corruption in the Chicago Futures Markets, Hoboken: Wiley, pp. 337, ISBN 978-0-471-53057-2
- Lambert, Emily (2010), The Futures: The Rise of the Speculator and the Origins of the World's Biggest Markets, New York: Basic Books, pp. 240, ISBN 978-0-465-01843-7
- MacKenzie, Donald (2006), An Engine, Not a Camera: How Financial Models Shape Markets, Cambridge: The MIT Press, pp. 389, ISBN 978-0-262-13460-6
- Melamed, Leo (2009), For crying out loud: from open outcry to the electronic screen, Hoeboken: Wiley, p. 343, ISBN 978-0-470-22943-9
- Melamed, Leo; Tamarkin, David (1996), Leo Melamed: Escape to the Futures, New York: Wiley, p. 488, ISBN 978-0-471-11215-0
