= Flooding the market =

When excessive supply lowers prices to unsustainably low levels

Flooding the market is an excess amount of inventory for sale causing an undesired drop in price for the product that can, in extreme cases, make the price go negative or make the products impossible to sell at any price.

Businesses take measures to avoid that effect. For example, publishers will release books from popular authors under pseudonyms, as with the Kenyatta series by Donald Goines, which were published under the name Al. C. Clarke. The same also occurred for Stephen King, who published several books under the pseudonym Richard Bachman.

Flooding the market can be done intentionally in an effort to eliminate competition and is then known as dumping.

== Examples ==
In the United States in 1956, commodities traders Sam Siegel and Vincent Kosuga bought up large quantities of onions and then flooded the market as part of a scheme to make money on a short position in onion futures. This sent the price of a 50-pound bag of onions down to only 10 cents, less than the value of the empty bag. Effectively, the price of the onions was negative. The incident led to the passing of the Onion Futures Act.

The video game crash of 1983 was largely caused by excess inventory of low-quality games. Atari, Inc. greatly overproduced the game E.T. and could not sell them, and disposed of the inventory in a landfill.

== See also ==
- Infant industry argument – Rationale for protectionism
- Market saturation – When a product reaches peak demand and sales struggle to grow further
- Predatory pricing – Deliberately undercutting prices to eliminate competition
- Underconsumption – Economic stagnation from inadequate consumer demand
