= Redistribution of income and wealth =

Political philosophy

Redistribution of income and wealth is the transfer of income and wealth (including physical property) from some individuals to others through a social mechanism such as taxation, welfare, public services, land reform, monetary policies, confiscation, divorce or tort law. The term typically refers to redistribution on an economy-wide basis rather than between selected individuals.

Understanding of the phrase varies, depending on personal perspectives, political ideologies and the selective use of statistics. It is frequently used in politics, to refer to perceived redistribution from those who have more to those who have less. Rarely, the term is used to describe laws or policies that cause redistribution in the opposite direction, from the poor to the rich.

The phrase is sometimes related to the term class warfare, where the redistribution is alleged to counteract harm caused by high-income earners and the wealthy through means such as unfairness and discrimination.

Redistribution tax policy should not be confused with predistribution policies. "Predistribution" is the idea that the state should try to prevent inequalities from occurring in the first place rather than through the tax and benefits system once they have occurred. For example, a government predistribution policy might require employers to pay all employees a living wage and not just a minimum wage, as a "bottom-up" response to widespread income inequalities or high poverty rates.

Many "top-down" taxation proposals have been floated. In the United States, the "Buffett Rule" is a hybrid taxation model composed of opposing systems intended to minimize the favoritism of special interests in tax design.

The effects of a redistributive system are actively debated on ethical and economic grounds. The subject includes an analysis of its rationales, objectives, means, and policy effectiveness.

== History ==
In antiquity, redistribution operated within a palace economy, whereby the government, meaning the dictator or pharaoh, had both the ability and the right to say who was taxed and who received special treatment. In the West, ancient civilisations had customs to aid wealth redistribution, such as the ancient Jews, whose Jubilee relieved the debts of the poor, and the ancient Greeks, whose liturgies saw the rich voluntarily financed the city-states.

In the early modern period, there have been experiments in agrarian socialism. For example, in the Plymouth Colony under the leadership of William Bradford, who recorded in his diary that this "common course" bred confusion, discontent, and distrust among colonists, who looked upon the system as a form of slavery.

A closely related term, distributism (also known as distributionism or distributivism), refers to an economic ideology that developed in Europe in the late 19th and early 20th century. It was based on the principles of Catholic social teaching, particularly the teachings of Pope Leo XIII in his encyclical Rerum Novarum and Pope Pius XI in Quadragesimo Anno. More recently, Pope Francis echoed the earlier Papal statements in his Evangelii Gaudium.

In 1789, Montesquieu posited in The Spirit of Law that progressive tax is most suited to liberty, whereas a regressive tax is most suited to slavery. In contemporary society, this principle is still prevalent, where progressive taxation is recognized as a means to redistribute income and wealth from the rich to the poor.

== Role in economic systems ==
Different types of economic systems feature varying degrees of interventionism aimed at redistributing income, depending on how unequal their initial distributions are. Free-market capitalist economies tend to feature high degrees of income redistribution. However, Japan's government engages in much less redistribution because its initial wage distribution is much more equal than Western economies. Likewise, the socialist planned economies of the former Soviet Union and Eastern bloc featured very little income redistribution because private capital and land income were restricted as most enterprises were state ownership and wage rates were set by central planners. In theoretical market socialist systems, redistribution wouldn't be required because the major drivers of wealth and income inequality under capitalist economies, the private ownership of firms and private capital income, would be replaced by collective or public ownership. This would effectively be a model of predistribution.

In a theoretical perfectly-competitive model of a market economy, the sole role of government would be to alter the initial distribution if income to achieve an efficient allocation of resources. Redistribution was found to increase consumption but decrease the incentive to work, which in turn reduces economic growth.

A comparison between (Soviet-type) socialist and capitalist systems in terms of distribution of income is much easier as both these systems stand practically implemented in a number of countries under compatible political systems. Economic inequality in almost all the Eastern European economies has increased after moving from socialist planned economies to capitalist market economies. These economies maintain some features of socialism like state-owned enterprises, and are argued to resemble closer social democracy than free-market capitalism.

For the Islamic distribution, the following are the three key elements of the Islamic Economic System, which have significant implications for the distribution of income and wealth (if fully implemented) and are markedly different from capitalism. The Islamic system is defined by the following three key elements: Ushr and Zakat, the prohibition of usury, and the Inheritance Law. Ushr is an obligatory payment from agriculture output at the time of harvesting. If agricultural land is irrigated by rain or some other natural freely available water the producer is obliged to pay ten percent of the output as Ushr.

In case irrigation water is not free of cost then the deduction would be five percent, while Zakat is a major instrument of restricting the excessive accumulation of wealth and helping the poor and most vulnerable members of the society, Secondly, usury, or charging interest, is prohibited. Elimination of interest from the economic system is a revolutionary step with profound effects on all spheres of economic activities. Finally, the Inheritance Law Of Islam is the distribution of the property of a deceased person from closest family members and moving towards a more distant family. Son(s), daughter(s), wife, husband and parents are the prime recipients. This distribution is explicitly illustrated in Quran and cannot be changed or modified. Under varying conditions, the share received by different relatives accordingly changes. The important principle is that the owner at the time of his/her death cannot change these shares.

== How views on redistribution are formed ==
The context that a person is in can influence their views on redistributive policies. For example, despite both being Western civilizations, typical Americans and Europeans do not have the same views on redistribution policies. This phenomenon persists even among people who would benefit most from redistributive policies, as poor Americans tend to favor redistributive policy less than equally poor Europeans. Research shows this is because when a society has a fundamental belief that those who work hard will earn rewards from their work, the society will favor lower redistributive policies. However, when a society as a whole believes that some combination of outside factors, such as luck or corruption, can contribute to determining one's wealth, those in the society will tend to favor higher redistributive policies. This leads to fundamentally different ideas of what is ‘just’ or fair in these countries and influences their overall views on redistribution.

People tend to favor redistributive policy that will help the groups that they are a member of. This is displayed in a study of Latin American lawmakers, where it is shown that lawmakers born into a lower social class tend to favor more redistributive policies than their counterparts born into a higher social class. Research has also found that women generally support redistribution more than men do, though the strength of this preference varies across countries. The perception that immigrants benefit more from welfare spending was found to be correlated with lower support for redistribution. The rich people who are living in the states with more redistribution, are more in favor of immigrants than poorer people, if this can make them pay lower wages.

The classic theory that individual preferences for redistribution decrease with their income, leading to societal preferences for redistribution that increase with income inequality has been disputed. Another context that can influence one's ideas of redistributive policies is the social class that one is born into. Most researchers accept that social class plays some role in determining someone's views towards redistributive policies. Perhaps the most important impact of government on the distribution of “wealth” is in the sphere of education—in ensuring that everyone has a certain amount of human capital. By providing all individuals, regardless of the wealth of their parents, with a free basic education, government reduces the degree of inequality that otherwise would exist.

Income inequality has many different connotations, three of which are of particular importance:

1. The moral dimension, which leads into the discussion of human rights. What kinds of reasons should a society accept for the emergence or existence of inequality and how much inequality between its members is reconcilable with the right of each individual to human dignity?
2. The second dimension links inequality to political stability. How much inequality can a society endure before a significant number of its members begin to reject the existing pattern of distribution and demand fundamental changes? In societies with very rigid forms of the income distribution, this may easily lead to public protest, if not violence. Authorities are then faced with the option of reacting to protests with repression or reform. In societies with flexible tools of negotiation and bargaining on income, smoother mechanisms of adaptation may be available.
3. The third dimension – in many cases the dominant pattern in the social debate – links inequality to economic performance. Individuals who achieve more and perform better deserve a higher income. If everybody is treated the same, the overall willingness to work may decline. The argument includes the scarcity of skills. Societies have to provide incentives to ensure that talents and education are allocated to jobs where they are needed most. Not many people doubt the general accuracy of these arguments – but nobody has ever shown how to correctly measure performance and how to find an objective way of linking it to the prevailing level of the income distribution. Inequality is needed – to some extent – but nobody knows how much of it is good.

Peter Singer argues there is an utilitarian moral obligation to help the poor. One study suggests that "the middle class faces a paradoxical status" in that they tend to vote against income redistribution, even though they would in some cases benefit from it.

=== Inequality in developing countries ===
The existence of high inequality within many developing countries, alongside persistent poverty, began to draw attention in the early 1970s. However, throughout the 1980s and into the 1990s, the dominant view among development economists was that inequality in poor countries was a less pressing issue compared to ensuring sufficient growth, which was believed to be the primary means of reducing poverty. The policy recommendation for developing countries was clear: it was not possible to simultaneously decrease poverty and inequality. This perspective was based on the belief that economic growth would eventually lead to a trickle-down effect, where the benefits of growth would eventually reach the poorest members of society. However, evidence began to emerge in the 1990s that challenged this notion and suggested that the link between economic growth and poverty reduction was not as strong as previously thought. This shift in thinking led to a reconsideration of the importance of addressing inequality in the pursuit of development.

== Modern forms of redistribution ==
The redistribution of wealth and its practical application are bound to change with the continuous evolution of social norms, politics, and culture. Within developed countries income inequality has become a widely popular issue that has dominated the debate stage for the past few years. The importance of a nation's ability to redistribute wealth in order to implement social welfare programs, maintain public goods, and drive economic development has brought various conversations to the political arena. A country's means of redistributing wealth comes from the implementation of a carefully thought out well described system of taxation. The implementation of such a system would aid in achieving the desired social and economic objective of diminishing social inequality and maximizing social welfare. There are various ways to impose a tax system that will help create a more efficient allocation of resources, in particular, many democratic, even socialist governments utilize a progressive system of taxation to achieve a certain level of income redistribution. In addition to the creation and implementation of these tax systems, "globalization of the world economy [has] provided incentives for reforming the tax systems" across the globe. Along with utilizing a system of taxation to achieve the redistribution of wealth, the same socio-economic benefit can be achieved if there are appropriate policies enacted within a current political infrastructure that addresses these issues. Modern thinking towards the topic of the redistribution of wealth, focuses on the concept that economic development increases the standard of living across an entire society.

Today, income redistribution occurs in some form in most democratic countries, through economic policies. Some redistributive policies attempt to take wealth, income, and other resources from the "haves" and give them to the "have-nots", but many redistributions go elsewhere.

Furthermore, redistribution is discussed in the realm of sustainability science, sometimes even considered as a fundamental sustainability strategy. Scholars such as Iris Borowy argue that ‘some form of absolute international redistribution’ is necessary, ‘in which the rich experience an actual reduction in their material income and wealth, the newly emerging societies accept stagnating levels while those at the bottom improve their standards’. However, such large scale international redistribution for purposes of sustainability cannot yet be observed.

=== Progressive income tax ===
For example, the U.S. government's progressive-rate income tax policy is redistributive because much tax revenue goes to social programs such as welfare and Medicare.

In a progressive income tax system, a high income earner will pay a higher tax rate (a larger percentage of their income) than a low income earner; and therefore, will pay more total dollars per person.

Other taxation-based methods of redistributing income are the negative income tax for very low income earners and tax loopholes (tax avoidance) for the better-off.

=== Government redistribution ===
Two other common types of governmental redistribution of income are subsidies and vouchers (such as food stamps or Section-8 housing vouchers). These transfer payment programs are funded through general taxation, but benefit the poor or influential special interest groups and corporations. While the persons receiving transfers from such programs may prefer to be directly given cash, these programs may be more palatable to society than cash assistance, as they give society some measure of control over how the funds are spent.

=== Benefit redistribution ===
Governmental redistribution of income may include a direct benefit program involving either cash transfers or the purchase of specific services for an individual. Medicare is one example. Medicare is a government-run health insurance program that covers people age 65 or older, certain younger people with disabilities, and people with end-stage renal disease (permanent kidney failure requiring dialysis or a transplant, sometimes called ESRD). This is a direct benefit program because the government is directly providing health insurance for those who qualify.

=== Gini Index ===
The difference between the Gini index for the income distribution before taxation and the Gini index after taxation is an indicator for the effects of such taxation.

=== Property redistribution ===
Over time, wealth passes from generation to generation. In 2024, the Silent Generation and baby boomers represented 25% of the population, but held 65% of all wealth in the US. An estimated 73.9% of inheritors are already in the top ten percentiles of net worth.

Though baby boomers have accumulated more wealth than later generations, Millennials and Generation X are accumulating wealth at rates that are comparable to that of baby boomers.

Wealth redistribution can be implemented through land reform that transfers ownership of land from one category of people to another, or through inheritance taxes, land value taxes or a broader wealth tax on assets in general. Before-and-after Gini coefficients for the distribution of wealth can be compared.

=== Land reform ===
Ownership of agricultural land and its distribution among the population is a key driver of a wide range of social, political and economic inequalities. Land reform (also known as agrarian reform) refers to the process of changing who owns agricultural land and who has the right to use these lands. Redistributive land reform refers to the narrower concept of transferring agricultural land ownership from large private landowners to small farmers and people without any landholdings. It involves the redistribution of wealth and political power that comes from owning large swathes of land. There are different types of land reform, including state-led and market-led agrarian reforms.

=== Other interventions ===
Interventions like rent control can impose large costs. Some alternative forms of interventions, such as housing subsidies, may achieve comparable distributional objectives at less cost. If the government cannot costlessly redistribute, it should look for efficient ways of redistributing—that is, ways that reduce the costs as much as possible. This is one of the main concerns of the branch of economics called the economics of the public sector.

== Objectives ==
The objectives of income redistribution are to increase economic stability and opportunity for the less wealthy members of society and thus usually include the funding of public services.

One basis for redistribution is the concept of distributive justice, whose premise is that money and resources ought to be distributed in such a way as to lead to a socially just, and possibly more financially egalitarian, society. Another argument is that a larger middle class benefits an economy by enabling more people to be consumers, while providing equal opportunities for individuals to reach a better standard of living. Seen for example in the work of John Rawls, another argument is that a truly fair society would be organized in a manner benefiting the least advantaged, and any inequality would be permissible only to the extent that it benefits the least advantaged.

Some proponents of redistribution argue that capitalism results in an externality that creates unequal wealth distribution.

Many economists have argued that wealth and income inequality are a cause of economic crises, and that reducing these inequalities is one way to prevent or ameliorate economic crises, with redistribution thus benefiting the economy overall. This view was associated with the underconsumptionism school in the 19th century, now considered an aspect of some schools of Keynesian economics; it has also been advanced, for different reasons, by Marxian economics. It was particularly advanced in the US in the 1920s by Waddill Catchings and William Trufant Foster. More recently, the so-called "Rajan hypothesis" posited that income inequality was at the basis of the explosion of the 2008 financial crisis. The reason is that rising inequality caused people on low and middle incomes, particularly in the US, to increase their debt to keep up their consumption levels with that of richer people. Borrowing was particularly high in the housing market and deregulation in the financial sector made it possible to extend lending in sub-prime mortgages. The downturn in the housing market in 2007 halted this process and triggered the 2008 financial crisis. Nobel Prize laureate Joseph Stiglitz, along with many others, supports this view.

There is currently a debate concerning the extent to which the world's extremely rich have become richer over recent decades. Thomas Piketty's Capital in the Twenty-First Century is at the forefront of the debate, mainly focusing on within-country concentration of income and wealth. Branko Milanovic provided evidence of increasing inequality at the global level, showing how the group of so-called "global plutocrats", i.e. the richest 1% in the world income distribution, were the main beneficiaries of economic growth in the period 1988–2008. More recent analysis supports this claim, as 27% of total economic growth worldwide accrued to the top 1% of the world income distribution in the period 1980–2016. The approach underpinning these analyses has been critiqued in certain publications such as The Economist.

== Criticism ==
Public choice theory states that redistribution tends to benefit those with political clout to set spending priorities more than those in need, who lack real influence on government.

The socialist economists John Roemer and Pranab Bardhan criticize redistribution via taxation in the context of Nordic-style social democracy, reportedly highlighting its limited success at promoting relative egalitarianism and its lack of sustainability. They point out that social democracy requires a strong labor movement to sustain its heavy redistribution, and that it is unrealistic to expect such redistribution to be feasible in countries with weaker labor movements. They point out that, even in the Scandinavian countries, social democracy has been in decline since the labor movement weakened. Instead, Roemer and Bardhan argue that changing the patterns of enterprise ownership and market socialism, obviating the need for redistribution, would be more sustainable and effective at promoting egalitarianism.

Marxian economists argue that social democratic reforms – including policies to redistribute income – such as unemployment benefits and high taxes on profits and the wealthy create more contradictions in capitalism by further limiting the efficiency of the capitalist system via reducing incentives for capitalists to invest in further production. In the Marxist view, redistribution cannot resolve the fundamental issues of capitalism – only a transition to a socialist economy can. Income redistribution will lower poverty by reducing inequality, if done properly. But it may not accelerate growth in any major way, except perhaps by reducing social tensions arising from inequality and allowing poor people to devote more resources to human and physical asset accumulation. Directly investing in opportunities for poor people is essential.

The distribution of income that emerges from competitive markets may be very unequal. However, under the conditions of the basic competitive model, a redistribution of wealth can move the economy to a more equal allocation that is also Pareto efficient.

== See also ==
- Basic income
- Criticism of welfare
- Distribution of wealth
- Economic policy
- Economic inequality
- Equality of outcome
- Global resources dividend
- Guaranteed minimum income
- Income tax
- Lima Declaration on Industrial Development and Cooperation
- Poverty reduction
- Redistribution (cultural anthropology)
- Robin Hood tax
- Robin Hood
- Social dividend
- Social inequality
- From each according to his ability, to each according to his needs
- He who does not work, neither shall he eat
- Wealth concentration
- Wealth tax
- Welfarism
- Zero-sum game

Lists:

- List of countries by income equality
- List of countries by inequality-adjusted HDI

Opposite tendencies:

- Accumulation by dispossession
- Primitive accumulation of capital
- Reserve army of labour
