= Onion Futures Act =

1958 United States law

- Long title: An act to prohibit trading in onion futures on commodity exchanges
- Enacted by: the 85th United States Congress
- Effective: August 28, 1958

Citations
- Public law: Pub. L. 85–839
- Statutes at Large: 72 Stat. 1013

Codification
- U.S.C. sections created: 7 U.S.C. § 13-1

Legislative history
- Introduced in the House as H.R. 376 by Gracie Pfost (D–ID) on January 3, 1957; Committee consideration by House Agriculture; Passed the House on March 13, 1958; Passed the Senate on July 11, 1958; Signed into law by President Dwight D. Eisenhower on August 28, 1958

Major amendments
- Dodd-Frank Wall Street Reform and Consumer Protection Act

The Onion Futures Act is a United States law banning the trading of futures contracts on onions as well as "motion picture box office receipts". In 1955, two onion traders, Sam Siegel and Vincent Kosuga, cornered the onion futures market on the Chicago Mercantile Exchange. The resulting regulatory actions led to the passing of the act on August 28, 1958. The law was amended in 2010 to add motion picture box office futures to the list of banned futures contracts, in response to lobbying efforts by the Motion Picture Association of America.

== History ==
=== Onion trading ===
Onion futures trading began on the Chicago Mercantile Exchange in the mid-1940s as an attempt to replace the income lost when the butter futures contract ceased. By the mid-1950s, onion futures contracts were the most traded product on the Chicago Mercantile Exchange. In 1955, they accounted for 20% of its trades.

=== Market manipulation ===
In the fall of 1955, Siegel and Kosuga bought so many onions and onion futures that they controlled 99.3% of the available onions in Chicago. Millions of pounds (thousands of metric tons) of onions were shipped to Chicago to cover their purchases. By late 1955, they had stored 30 million pounds (14,000 t) of onions in Chicago. They soon changed course and convinced onion growers to begin purchasing their inventory by threatening to flood the market with onions if they did not. Siegel and Kosuga told the growers that they would hold the rest of their inventory in order to support the price of onions.

As the growers began buying onions, Siegel and Kosuga accumulated short positions on a large number of onion contracts. They also arranged to have their stores of onions reconditioned because they had started to spoil. They shipped them outside of Chicago to have them cleaned and then repackaged and re-shipped back to Chicago. The "new" shipments of onions caused many futures traders to think that there was an excess of onions and further drove down onion prices in Chicago. By the end of the onion season in March 1956, Siegel and Kosuga had flooded the markets with their onions and driven the price of 50 pounds (23 kg) of onions down to 10 cents a bag. In August 1955, the same quantity of "Odorous Onions" had been priced at $2.75 a bag. So many onions were shipped to Chicago in order to depress prices that there were onion shortages in other parts of the United States.

Siegel and Kosuga made millions of dollars on the transaction due to their short position on onion futures. At one point, however, 50 pounds (23 kg) of onions were selling in Chicago for less than the bags that held them (effectively, for a negative price). This drove many onion farmers into bankruptcy. A public outcry ensued among onion farmers who were left with large amounts of worthless inventory. Many of the farmers had to pay to dispose of the large amounts of onions that they had purchased and grown.

=== Regulatory action ===
In the aftermath of the crash, many commentators characterized Kosuga's actions as unprincipled gambling. The abrupt change in prices gained the attention of the Commodity Exchange Authority. Soon they launched an investigation and the U.S. Senate Committee on Agriculture and House Committee on Agriculture held hearings on the matter.

During the hearings, the Commodity Exchange Authority stated that it was the perishable nature of onions which made them vulnerable to price swings. Then-congressman Gerald Ford of Michigan sponsored a bill, known as the Onion Futures Act, which banned futures trading in onions. The bill was unpopular among traders, some of whom argued that onion shortages were not a crucial issue since they were used as a condiment rather than a staple food. The president of the Chicago Mercantile Exchange, E. B. Harris, lobbied hard against the bill. Harris described it as "burning down the barn to find a suspected rat". The measure was passed, however, and President Dwight D. Eisenhower signed the bill in August 1958. Thus, onions were excluded from the definition of "commodity" in the Commodity Exchange Act.

== Impact ==
=== Effect on the Chicago Mercantile Exchange ===
After the ban was enacted, the Chicago Mercantile Exchange filed a lawsuit in the United States District Court for the Northern District of Illinois alleging that the ban unfairly restricted trade. After a federal judge ruled against them, they declined to appeal to the Supreme Court and the ban stood.

The loss of a lucrative trading product was devastating to the Chicago Mercantile Exchange. The other products that were traded, including futures contracts on eggs, turkeys, and potatoes, were not large enough to support the exchange. This led to the emergence of new leadership who pioneered a different strategy, expanding the exchange's traded products to include futures contracts on pork bellies and frozen concentrate orange juice. These proved to be popular products and eventually restored lost popularity to the Chicago Mercantile Exchange.

=== Effect on price volatility ===
The ban has provided academics with a unique opportunity to study the effect of an active futures market on commodity prices. Experts have been divided on the effect that onion futures trading has on the volatility of onion prices. Holbrook Working published a study in 1960 which argued that price volatility declined after the futures market for onions was introduced in the 1940s. Working cited this study as proof of the efficient-market hypothesis. In 1963, this theory was lent more support by a study published by Roger Gray. Gray, an expert in agricultural futures markets and professor emeritus of economics at Stanford University, concluded that onion price volatility increased after the Onion Futures Act was passed.

Aaron C. Johnson published a study in 1973 that contradicted Gray's findings. He found that onion price volatility in the 1960s was the lowest of any decade on record. Financial journalist Justin Fox noted that even though onion prices in the 1960s might have been more stable due to better weather or advances in transportation methods: "There was certainly no clear evidence from the onion fields to support the presumption that speculative markets got prices right." In the 2000s, onion prices were significantly more volatile than corn or oil prices. This volatility led the son of a farmer who initially lobbied for the ban to advocate a return to onion futures trading.

=== Repeal efforts ===
In April 2026, a group of undergraduate students at the University of Chicago formed For Our Futures, an advocacy organization seeking the repeal of the act. On April 17, the group held a demonstration on the university's main quadrangle, distributed approximately 100 raw onions, and collected 131 signatures on a petition supporting repeal. Four members subsequently held a similar demonstration at Northwestern University on May 1, where they reported collecting another 99 signatures. The organizers said that its objective of legalizing onion futures was genuine. The campaign was also discussed by Bloomberg Opinion columnist Matt Levine.

== See also ==
- Title 7 of the United States Code
- Market manipulation

== Bibliography ==
- Lambert, Emily (2010), The Futures: The Rise of the Speculator and the Origins of the World's Biggest Markets, New York: Basic Books, pp. 240, ISBN 978-0-465-01843-7
- Markham, Jerry (2002), From J.P. Morgan to the Institutional Investor (1900-1970), A Financial History of the United States, vol. 2, New York: M.E. Sharpe, p. 480, ISBN 978-0-7656-0730-0
- Greising, David; Morse, Laurie (1991), Brokers, Bagmen, and Moles: Fraud and Corruption in the Chicago Futures Markets, Hoboken: Wiley, pp. 337, ISBN 978-0-471-53057-2
