= CHBC =

The acronym CHBC can refer to:

- CHBC-DT, a television station in British Columbia owned-and-operated by Global.
- Capitol Hill Babysitting Cooperative, a Washington D.C. cooperative for babysitting used as an allegory in economics
