= Roger Grey =

Roger Grey may refer to:

- Roger Grey, 10th Earl of Stamford (1896–1976)
- Roger Grey, 1st Baron Grey of Ruthin (c. 1298–1353)

== See also ==
- Sir Roger de Grey (1918–1995), British landscape painter
- Roger Gray (disambiguation)
