= Negative value =

Negative value may refer to:

- Negative predictive value in statistics
- Negative ethic or philosophic value
- Negative pricing
- Insolvency
