= Market saturation =

When a product reaches peak demand and sales struggle to grow further

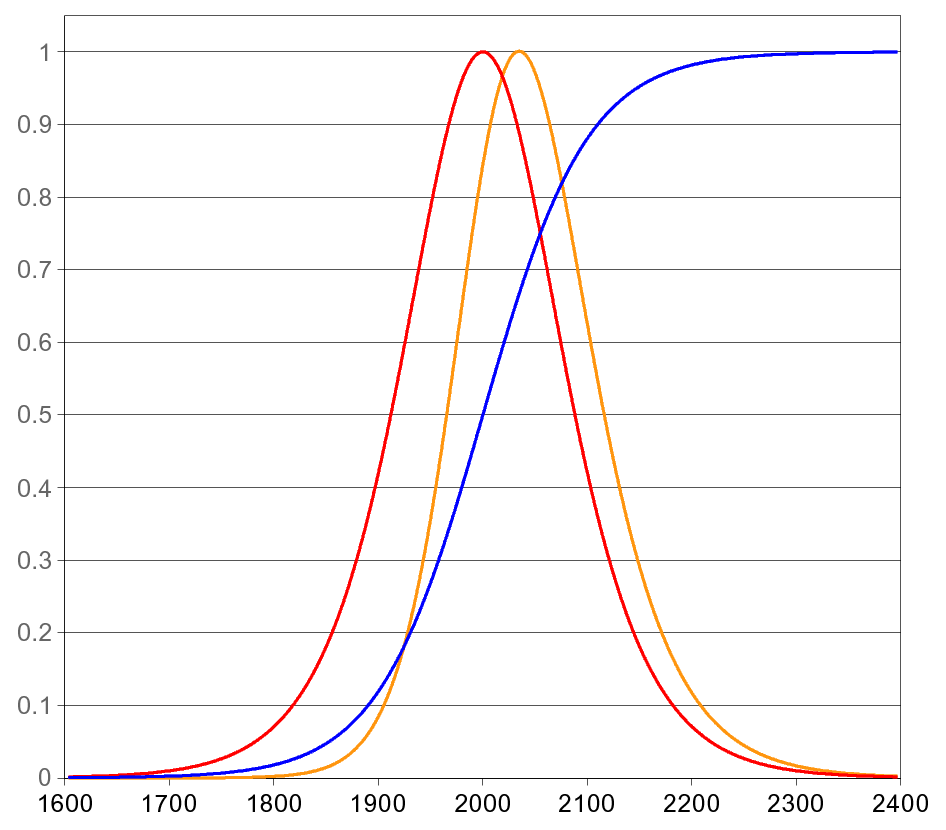
Logistic growth is an example for a bounded growth which is limited by saturation: The graph shows an imaginary market with logistic growth. In that example, the blue curve depicts the development of the size of that market. The red curve describes the growth of such a market as the first derivative of the market volume. The yellow curve illustrates the growth weighted by the size of the market. As for logistic growth, the yellow curve shows that even a large market size cannot strengthen growth when approaching saturation. Logistic growth never is negative, but in the saturation area, the growth is as small as before the market took off. (In the example all curves are scaled to cover the range between 0 and 1.)

In economics, market saturation is a situation in which a product has become diffused (distributed) within a market; the actual level of saturation can depend on consumer purchasing power; as well as competition, prices, and technology.

== Theory of natural limits ==
The theory of natural limits states: "Every product or service has a natural consumption level. We just don't know what it is until we launch it, distribute it, and promote it for a generation's time (20 years or more) after which further investment to expand the universe beyond normal limits can be a futile exercise." — attributed to Thomas G. Osenton, economist

Osenton introduced the theory in his 2004 book, The Death of Demand: Finding Growth in a Saturated Global Economy; it states that every product or service has a natural consumption level that is determined after a number of years of sales- and marketing-investment (usually around 20 to 25 years). In effect, a relative universe of regular users is naturally established by market forces such as market saturation over time, after which any significant expansion of that universe becomes extraordinarily difficult. The point at which these natural limits are reached is referred to by Osenton using a phrase from 1974: "innovation saturation".

=== Example ===
For example, Time Inc. launched the American weekly consumer-magazine Sports Illustrated in 1954 with 400,000 subscribers and the numbers of purchasers grew through the 1960s, 1970s, and 1980s until it reached 3.5 million subscribers in the late 1980s, where it has remained ever since. With some estimates of up to 100 million sports-fans in the United States, many at Time Inc. believed that the Sports Illustrated subscription-base could have increased much more. However, after many years of investment, the sports weekly reached its natural (and most profitable) consumption-level – where it remained for more than 20 years.

== "Flooding the market" ==
When suppliers abruptly offer large quantities for sale and saturate the market, this is known as flooding the market.

For example, in advanced economies, more than 97% of households own refrigerators. Hence, the diffusion rate is more than 97%, and the market is said to be saturated; i.e. further growth of sales of refrigerators will occur basically only as a result of population growth and in cases where one manufacturer is able to gain market share at the expense of others.

To give another example, in advanced western households (and depending on the economy), the number of automobiles per family is greater than 1. To the extent that further market growth (i.e. growth of the demand for automobiles) is constrained (the main buyers already own the product), the market is said to be basically saturated. Future sales depend on several factors including the rate of obsolescence (at what age cars are replaced), population growth, societal changes such as the spread of multi-car families, and the creation of new niche markets such as sports cars or camper vans.

== See also ==
- Flooding the market
- Underconsumption
- Keynesian economics
- Oligopoly
- Planned obsolescence
