= Paradox of flexibility =

The paradox of flexibility is that a debt deflation shock can create a situation where increased price and wage flexibility results in decreased total demand. This term was introduced by economists Paul Krugman and Gauti Eggertsson in the paper Debt, Deleveraging, and the Liquidity Trap: A Fisher-Minsky-Koo Approach. The term was intended to complement the "paradox of thrift", a concept resurrected by John Maynard Keynes and Eggertsson's earlier work on the "paradox of toil". Krugman and Eggertsson proposed that the paradox of toil and the paradox of flexibility mean that wage and price flexibility do not facilitate recovery from recessions during a liquidity trap, but actually exacerbate them.
