= Norris, Illinois =

- Village
- Location of Norris in Fulton County, Illinois.

- Location of Illinois in the United States
- Coordinates: 40°37′32″N 90°01′55″W
- Country: United States
- State: Illinois
- County: Fulton
- Townships: Farmington, Canton

Area
  - Total: 0.28 sq mi (0.73 km^{2})
  - Land: 0.28 sq mi (0.73 km^{2})
  - Water: 0 sq mi (0.00 km^{2})
- Elevation: 732 ft (223 m)

Population (2020)
  - Total: 173
- Time zone: UTC-6 (CST)
  - Summer (DST): UTC-5 (CDT)
- ZIP Code(s): 61520
- Area code: 309
- FIPS code: 17-53390
- GNIS ID: 2399505
- Wikimedia Commons: Norris, Illinois

Norris is a village in Fulton County, Illinois, United States. The population was 173 at the 2020 census.

== Geography ==
Norris is located in northeastern Fulton County. Illinois Route 78 passes through the southeast corner of the village, leading south 4.5 miles (7.2 km) to Canton, the largest city in Fulton County, and north 6 miles (10 km) to Farmington.

According to the 2010 census, Norris has a total area of 0.28 square miles (0.73 km^{2}), all land.

== Demographics ==
Historical population
Census	Pop.	Note	%±
1910	560		—
1920	382		−31.8%
1930	329		−13.9%
1940	339		3.0%
1950	319		−5.9%
1960	307		−3.8%
1970	359		16.9%
1980	276		−23.1%
1990	212		−23.2%
2000	194		−8.5%
2010	213		9.8%
2020	173		−18.8%
U.S. Decennial Census

As of the 2020 census there were 173 people, 82 households, and 50 families residing in the village. The population density was 611.31 inhabitants per square mile (236.03/km^{2}). There were 89 housing units at an average density of 314.49 per square mile (121.43/km^{2}). The racial makeup of the village was 96.53% White, 0.00% African American, 0.58% Native American, 0.00% Asian, 0.00% Pacific Islander, 0.00% from other races, and 2.89% from two or more races. Hispanic or Latino of any race were 0.58% of the population.

There were 82 households, out of which 40.2% had children under the age of 18 living with them, 43.90% were married couples living together, 8.54% had a female householder with no husband present, and 39.02% were non-families. 30.49% of all households were made up of individuals, and 12.20% had someone living alone who was 65 years of age or older. The average household size was 4.02 and the average family size was 3.11.

The village's age distribution consisted of 40.8% under the age of 18, 1.2% from 18 to 24, 31.8% from 25 to 44, 15.3% from 45 to 64, and 11.0% who were 65 years of age or older. The median age was 30.3 years. For every 100 females, there were 70.0 males. For every 100 females age 18 and over, there were 93.6 males.

The median income for a household in the village was $51,875, and the median income for a family was $58,462. Males had a median income of $40,500 versus $21,705 for females. The per capita income for the village was $21,951. About 8.0% of families and 9.8% of the population were below the poverty line, including 7.7% of those under age 18 and 35.7% of those age 65 or over.

== Notable person ==
- E.B. Harris, president of the Chicago Mercantile Exchange (1953–1978)
