= Roger Gray =

Roger Gray may refer to:

- Roger Gray (academic) (1921–1996), professor and expert on agricultural futures markets
- Roger Gray (judge) (1921–1992), English High Court judge and cricketer
- Roger Gray (actor) (1881–1959), American character actor
