= Paradox of toil =

Economic hypothesis

The paradox of toil is the economic hypothesis that, under certain conditions, total employment will shrink if there is an increased desire among the population to take on paid work. According to the macroeconomist Gauti Eggertsson, this occurs when "the short-term nominal interest rate is zero and there are deflationary pressures and output contraction". When wages are pushed down by the simultaneous efforts of everyone in the labor force to work more even at lower wages, with interest rates against the zero bound, demand must fall because the only source of added demand would be added credit to compensate for those lower wages, credit which cannot be made available on any looser terms; this loss of demand from lower wages leads to a loss of jobs. The belief that there must necessarily be more work available if wages drop is an example of the fallacy of composition.

The paradox of toil was proposed by Gauti Eggertsson in 2009. The term was coined to parallel the "paradox of thrift", a concept resurrected by John Maynard Keynes and popularized under that name by Paul Samuelson.

== Debate ==
Casey Mulligan argued against this effect, proposing several natural tests, among them:

- seasonal fluctuations in the job market in 2009;
- the increase in the U.S. minimum wage in 2009.

These, he said, failed to demonstrate the paradoxical effects.

Eggertsson responded that seasonal labor supply variations, being relatively predictable, would have negligible effect on nominal short-term interest rates; and that an increase in the minimum wage affected only aggregate employment, with paradox of toil saying nothing about composition.

Paul Krugman and Eggertsson have since proposed that the paradox of toil and the paradox of flexibility mean that wage and price flexibility do not facilitate recovery from recessions during a liquidity trap, but actually exacerbate them.

== Influence ==
The reasoning behind the paradox of toil, together with the paradox of flexibility, has led to speculation that there might be a "paradox of innovation" by which greater labor productivity or cheaper products reduces demand for labor, which reduces wages, and therefore reduces demand overall.

== See also ==
- Baumol's cost disease
