= Black Dirt Region =

Fertile agricultural area in New York, USA

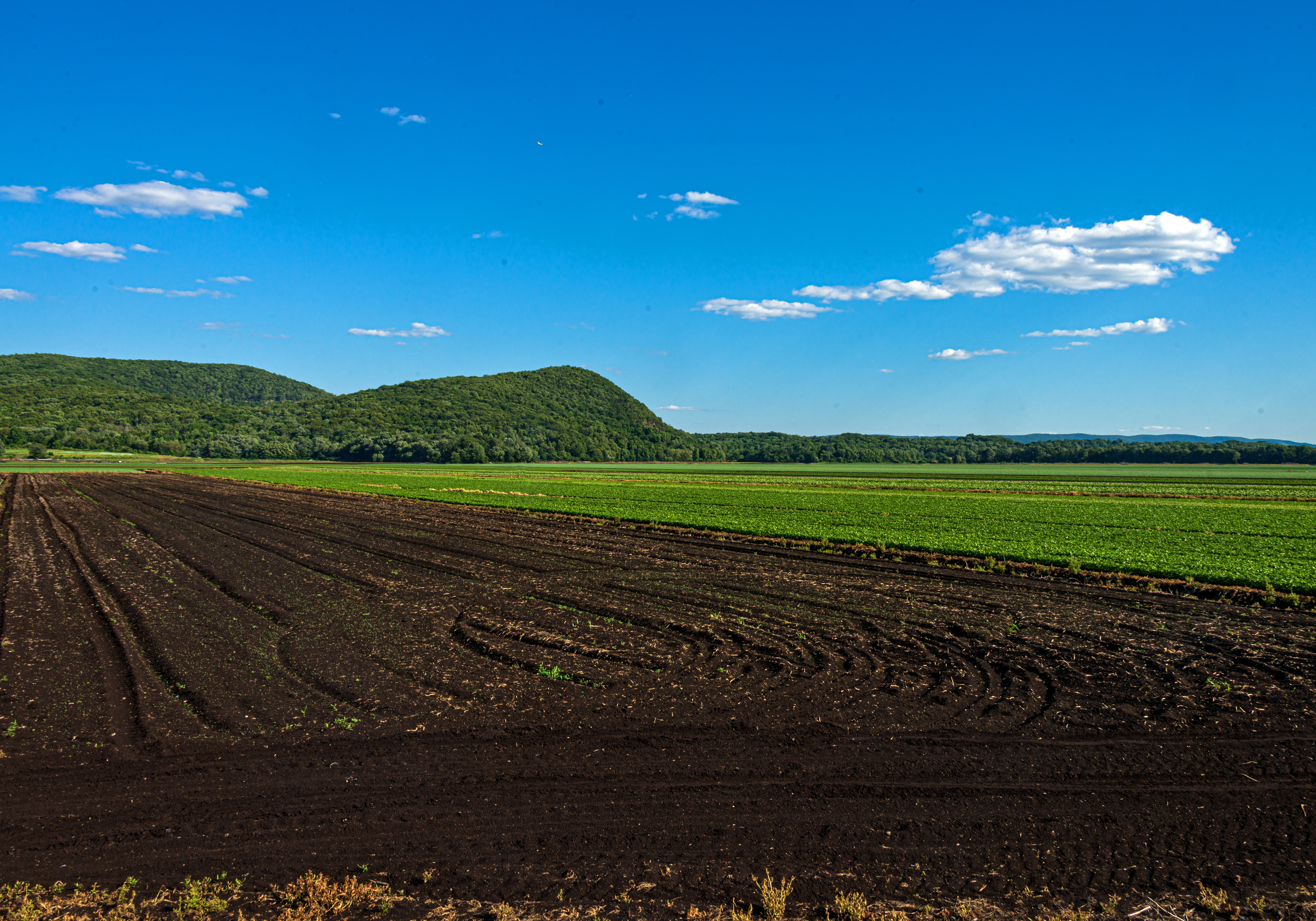
Black dirt field near the hamlet of Pine Island

The Black Dirt Region is located in southern Orange County, New York and northern Sussex County, New Jersey. It is primarily located in the western section of the Town of Warwick, centered on the hamlet of Pine Island. Some sections spill over into adjacent portions of the towns of Chester, Goshen and Wawayanda in New York and parts of Wantage and Vernon, New Jersey. Before the region was drained around 1880 by the Polish and Volga German immigrants through drainage culverts and the construction of the Cheechunk Canal, it was a densely-vegetated marsh known as the "Drowned Lands of the Wallkill".

The Black Dirt Region takes its name from the dark, extremely fertile sapric soil left over from an ancient glacial lake bottom augmented by decades of past flooding of the Wallkill River. The 26,000 acres (10,400 ha) of muck left over is the largest concentration of such soil in the United States outside the Florida Everglades.

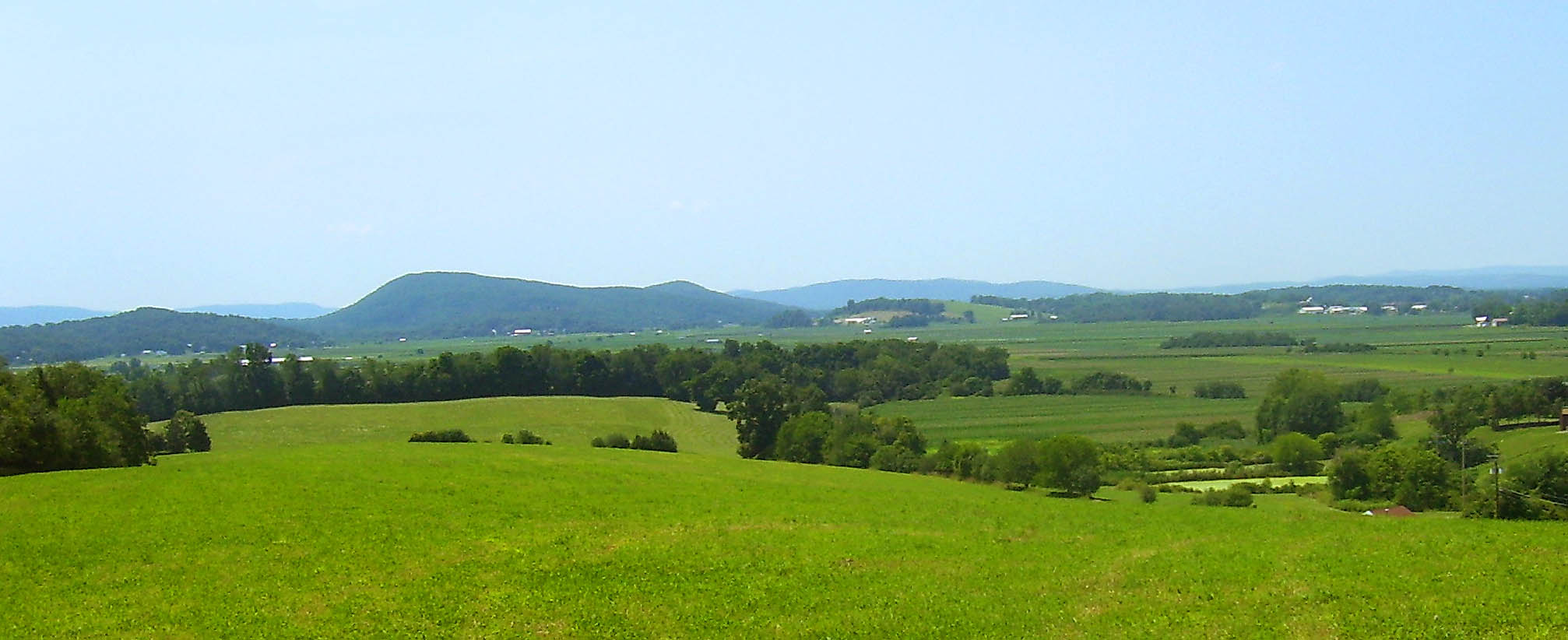
The Black Dirt Region, viewed looking south from a hill in the Town of Goshen.

== Geography ==
The area mainly consists of flat flood plain. The few areas that rise above the valley floor are known as "islands", since they often were in times of heavy flooding. New Jersey's Pochuck Mountain looms just to the south of the region, and the ridge continues into the region as a small upland area called Pochuck Neck; there are two smaller hills within it known as Mounts Adam and Eve, rising to 900 and 1,060 feet (270 and 320 m) respectively. The area is also very noticeable on satellite imagery by the color differential from its surroundings.

== History ==
Farmers generally avoided the area in the early years of settlement because the soil, although rich, was frequently flooded and poorly drained. Instead, the land was used for pasture, though sudden storms would often drown the stock. In 1804, talks began about the best way to drain the swampland. First, an attempt was made to clear the natural obstacles, which proved too expensive. Instead, a drainage canal was constructed by General George D. Wickham through his property in 1835. (The former course is now a creek meandering parallel). Immigrants from Eastern Europe, particularly Poles and Volga Germans, had worked in similar soils in their native countries and began farming the former swampland. In the mid-19th century, they won a series of conflicts with downstream millers later dubbed "the Muskrat and Beaver Wars", giving them the right to prevent a dam from being built on the drainage channel

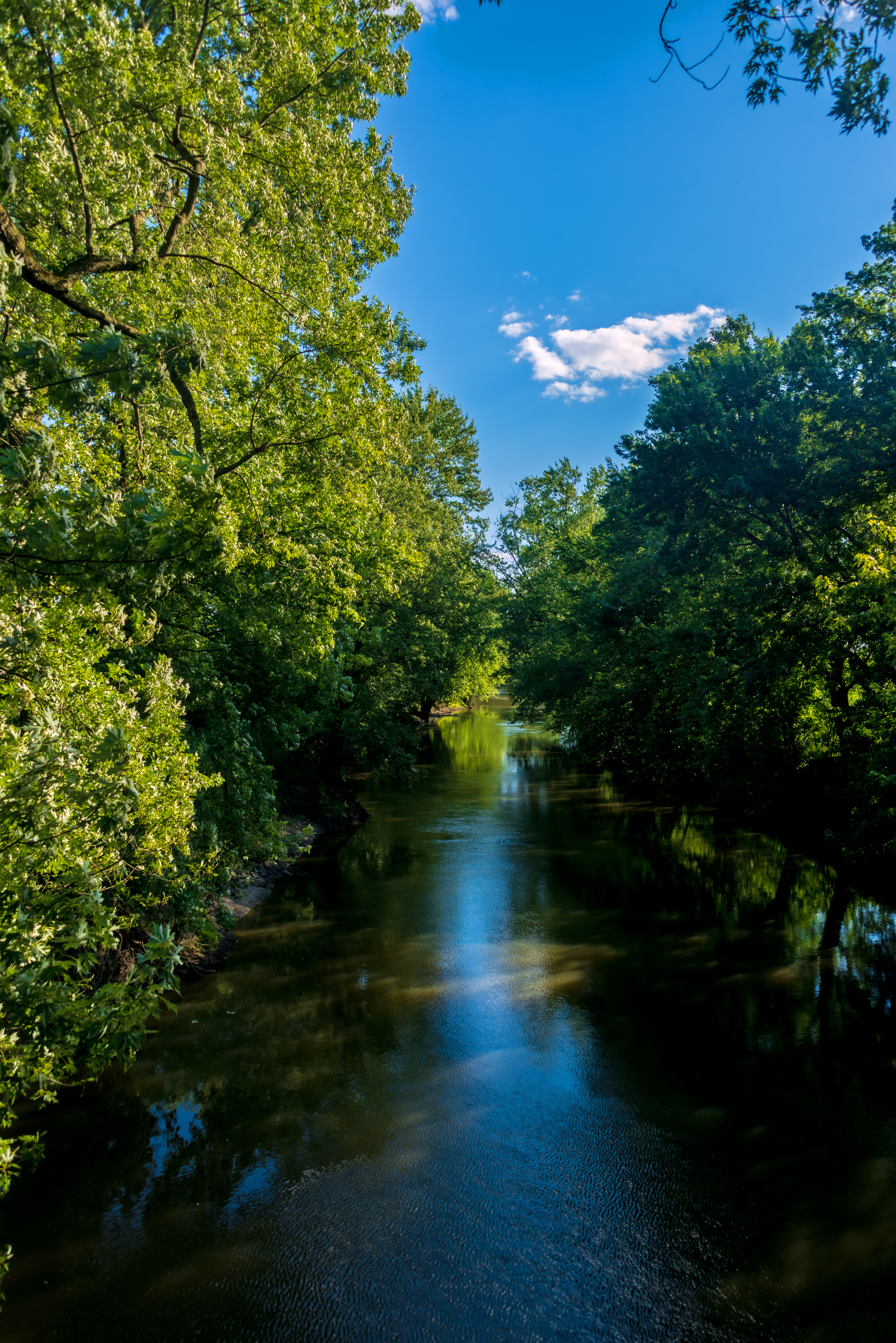
The Wallkill in the Black Dirt Region, channelized for flood control

They eventually began growing the pungent, highly prized black dirt onion on the land, taking advantage of the relative proximity of New York City as a market. By the late 20th century, the region produced an average of 30,000 lb/acre of onion (3.4 kg/m^{2}). Today, due to changing popular tastes in onions and different economic realities, that staple is not as profitable as it was. Farmers in the region have been diversifying their crops to include lettuce, radish, potatoes, tomatoes, carrots, and, increasingly, sod, hemp, and cannabis. Hemp can be seen thriving near the villages of Florida and Warwick, and extensive cannabis cultivation facilities are now operating at the site of the former Mid-Orange Correctional Facility. Development of the farmland is considered unlikely since the soil is inferior for building.

== See also ==
- Terra preta
- Vincent Kosuga
