= Cheryl Rogowski =

American farmer

- Known for: farmer
- Awards: MacArthur Fellow

Cheryl Rogowski (born c. 1960) is an American farmer from Pine Island, New York.

She began farming in 1983 when the Onion Harvest Festival was reestablished and she was crowned Princess.

In 1984, in her early 20s, she received 5,000 acres (20 km^{2}) from her father and grew broom corn, sunflowers, zinnias, chili peppers, ground cherries.

She grew a community-supported agriculture program, starting in 1998, from 12 to 156 members, and sells at farmers' markets. She participates in El Puente ("The Bridge") CSA for low-income people. She supports English lessons for migrant workers, mentors Future Farmers of America students, and helps with "Just Food", and "The Tastemakers" annual food festival.

She appeared on an Urban Farming panel in New York City.

== Awards ==
- 2004 MacArthur Fellows Program
