= Canton Township, Fulton County, Illinois =

Canton Township
- Township
- Location in Fulton County

- Fulton County's location in Illinois
- Coordinates: 40°34′54″N 90°02′47″W
- Country: United States
- State: Illinois
- County: Fulton
- Established: November 6, 1849

Area
  - Total: 35.64 sq mi (92.3 km^{2})
  - Land: 34.74 sq mi (90.0 km^{2})
  - Water: 0.90 sq mi (2.3 km^{2}) 2.53%
- Elevation: 676 ft (206 m)

Population (2020)
  - Total: 14,217
  - Density: 409.2/sq mi (158.0/km^{2})
- Time zone: UTC-6 (CST)
  - Summer (DST): UTC-5 (CDT)
- ZIP codes: 61427, 61520, 61531
- FIPS code: 17-057-11020

Canton Township is one of twenty-six townships in Fulton County, Illinois, USA. As of the 2020 census, its population was 14,217 and it contained 6,284 housing units.

== Geography ==
According to the 2021 census gazetteer files, Canton Township has a total area of 35.64 square miles (92.31 km^{2}), of which 34.74 square miles (89.98 km^{2}) (or 97.47%) is land and 0.90 square miles (2.33 km^{2}) (or 2.53%) is water.

=== Cities, towns, villages ===
- Canton (vast majority)
- Norris (south half)

=== Unincorporated towns ===
- Brereton
- East Lawndale
- Prospect Heights Addition
- Village Square
- Westview Acres

(This list is based on USGS data and may include former settlements.)

=== Cemeteries ===
The township contains these seven cemeteries: Greenwood, Hanson, Johnson, Norris, Saint Josephs, Saint Marys and White Chapel.

=== Major highways ===
- Illinois Route 9
- Illinois Route 78

=== Airports and landing strips ===
- Ingersoll Airport

=== Lakes ===
- Van Winkle Lake

=== Landmarks ===
- Big Creek Park
- Graham Hosp

== Demographics ==
As of the 2020 census there were 14,217 people, 5,601 households, and 3,146 families residing in the township. The population density was 398.92 inhabitants per square mile (154.02/km^{2}). There were 6,284 housing units at an average density of 176.32 per square mile (68.08/km^{2}). The racial makeup of the township was 85.74% White, 7.56% African American, 0.18% Native American, 0.34% Asian, 0.02% Pacific Islander, 2.70% from other races, and 3.45% from two or more races. Hispanic or Latino of any race were 3.56% of the population.

There were 5,601 households, out of which 23.90% had children under the age of 18 living with them, 42.72% were married couples living together, 7.48% had a female householder with no spouse present, and 43.83% were non-families. 36.70% of all households were made up of individuals, and 18.40% had someone living alone who was 65 years of age or older. The average household size was 2.21 and the average family size was 2.81.

The township's age distribution consisted of 16.5% under the age of 18, 7.4% from 18 to 24, 26.9% from 25 to 44, 27.5% from 45 to 64, and 21.7% who were 65 years of age or older. The median age was 44.4 years. For every 100 females, there were 112.6 males. For every 100 females age 18 and over, there were 122.8 males.

The median income for a household in the township was $45,836, and the median income for a family was $60,896. Males had a median income of $45,208 versus $23,565 for females. The per capita income for the township was $29,994. About 13.9% of families and 18.7% of the population were below the poverty line, including 25.6% of those under age 18 and 7.7% of those age 65 or over.

Historical population
Census	Pop.	Note	%±
2000	15,990		—
2010	15,703		−1.8%
2020	14,217		−9.5%
U.S. Decennial Census

== School districts ==
- Canton Union School District 66

== Political districts ==
- Illinois's 17th congressional district
- State House District 91
- State Senate District 46
