= Vincent Kosuga =

American farmer and commodity trader (1915–2001)

- Born: January 17, 1915; Pine Island, New York, U.S.
- Died: January 19, 2001 (aged 86); Goshen, New York, U.S.
- Occupations: Onion farmer and commodity trader
- Known for: Manipulating the onion futures market

Vincent W. Kosuga (January 17, 1915 – January 19, 2001) was an American onion farmer and commodity trader best known for manipulating the onion futures market. Public outcry over his practices led to the passing of the Onion Futures Act, which banned the trading of futures contracts on onions.

== Personal life ==
The son of a Russian Jew who converted to Catholicism, Kosuga was a devout Catholic. He donated a significant amount of his fortune to the church, and was rewarded with private audiences with three popes.

Kosuga carried a .38 caliber pistol and a billy club with him at all times. He drove stock cars in his spare time and was a licensed pilot. He once survived a plane crash near Oswego, New York when the plane he was flying ran out of fuel mid-flight. He was left in a body cast after the crash, but made a quick recovery.

== Farming ==
Born and raised in Pine Island, New York, Kosuga owned a 5,000-acre (2,000 ha) black dirt farm where he grew onions, celery, and lettuce. His customers included the U.S. Army and Campbell's soup. He also began trading wheat futures. After an unsuccessful stint trading in which he was brought to the brink of bankruptcy, Kosuga withdrew from commodity trading and at his wife's insistence focused on farming full-time.

== Commodity trading ==
Kosuga was unable to leave trading behind permanently, however, and returned to the commodity market where he began trading onion futures. At the time, onions futures contracts were the most traded product on the Chicago Mercantile Exchange, accounting for 20% of its trades in 1955.

He soon began splitting his time between New York and Chicago, where he traded on the Chicago Mercantile Exchange several days a week. In Chicago, he was a very successful trader. He lavished expensive gifts upon his brokers, buying them each a new Buick one year. One of his brokers eventually rose to the position of Chairman of the exchange.

Kosuga sometimes used deceptive practices to manipulate the futures market. He once bribed a weather bureau to issue a frost warning in order to inflate the price of futures contracts that he owned. The weather bureau did issue the warning, though the temperature never fell below 50 °F (10 °C).

=== Cornering the onion market ===
With his partner Sam Siegel, a fellow onion trader and owner of a local produce company, Kosuga embarked upon a scheme to corner the onion futures market. In the fall of 1955, Siegel and Kosuga bought enough onions and onion futures so that they controlled 98 percent of the available onions in Chicago. Millions of pounds of onions were shipped to Chicago to cover their purchases. By late 1955, they had stored 30,000,000 pounds (14,000,000 kg) of onions in Chicago. They soon changed course and convinced onion growers to begin purchasing their inventory by threatening to flood the market with onions if they did not. Siegel and Kosuga told the growers that they would hold the rest of their inventory in order to support the price of onions.

As the growers began buying onions, Siegel and Kosuga purchased short positions on a large amount of onion contracts. They also arranged to have their stores of onions reconditioned because they had begun to spoil. They shipped them outside of Chicago to have them cleaned and then repackaged and re-shipped back to Chicago. The new shipments of onions caused many futures traders to think that there was an excess of onions and further drove down onion prices in Chicago. In August 1955, onions had been priced at $2.75 a bag. By the end of the onion season in March 1956, Siegel and Kosuga had flooded the markets with their onions and driven the price of 50 pounds (23 kg) of onions down to 10 cents a bag. So many onions were shipped to Chicago in order to depress prices that there were onion shortages in other parts of the United States.

Siegel and Kosuga made millions of dollars on the transaction due to their short position on onion futures. At one point, 50 pounds (23 kg) of onions were selling in Chicago for less than the bags that held them. This drove many onion farmers into bankruptcy. A public outcry ensued among onion farmers who were left with large amounts of worthless inventory. Many of the farmers had to pay to dispose of the large amounts of onions that they had purchased and grown.

=== Regulatory action ===
In the aftermath of the crash, many commentators characterized Kosuga's actions as unprincipled gambling. Kosuga was defiant, replying to his critics: "If it's against the law to make money... then I'm guilty". The abrupt change in prices gained the attention of the Commodity Exchange Authority. Soon they launched an investigation and the U.S. Senate Committee on Agriculture and House Committee on Agriculture held hearings on the matter.

Kosuga testified before Congress, and defended his practices under questioning from members of the committee. During the hearings, the Commodity Exchange Authority stated that it was the perishable nature of onions which made them vulnerable to price swings. Then-congressman Gerald Ford of Michigan sponsored a bill, known as the Onion Futures Act, which banned futures trading on onions. The bill was unpopular among traders, some of whom argued that onion shortages were not a crucial issue since they were used as a condiment rather than a staple food. The president of the Chicago Mercantile Exchange, E. B. Harris, lobbied hard against the bill. Harris described it as "burning down the barn to find a suspected rat". The measure was passed, however, and President Dwight D. Eisenhower signed the bill in August 1958.

After the ban was passed, the Chicago Mercantile Exchange filed a lawsuit in federal court alleging that the ban unfairly restricted trade. After a federal judge ruled against them, they declined to appeal to the Supreme Court and the ban stood.

== Later life ==
After the futures market was reformed, Kosuga returned to New York full-time and focused on his local business interests and philanthropy. Kosuga opened a restaurant next to his farm called The Jolly Onion Inn, where he served as a chef. The Jolly Onion Inn (later known as Ye Jolly Onion Inn) became one of the most popular restaurants in Orange County.

He became well respected for his philanthropy, and in 1987 was named Pine Island Citizen of the Year by the Pine Island Chamber of Commerce. After Kosuga died, his widow, Polly Kosuga (1915–2009), continued his philanthropy.

== Bibliography ==
- Lambert, Emily (2010), The Futures: The Rise of the Speculator and the Origins of the World's Biggest Markets, New York: Basic Books, pp. 240, ISBN 978-0-465-01843-7
- Markham, Jerry (2002), From J.P. Morgan to the Institutional Investor (1900-1970), A Financial History of the United States, vol. 2, New York: M.E. Sharpe, p. 480, ISBN 978-0-7656-0730-0
- Greising, David; Morse, Laurie (1991), Brokers, Bagmen, and Moles: Fraud and Corruption in the Chicago Futures Markets, Hoboken: Wiley, pp. 337, ISBN 978-0-471-53057-2
