= Roger Gray (academic) =

American academic

Roger Winks Gray (April 21, 1921 – September 5, 1996) was an economist and academic from the United States. He was the Holbrook Working Professor of Commodity Price Studies professor emeritus at Stanford University, whose academic focus was on agricultural futures markets.

== Biography ==
Born and raised in Watseka, Illinois, Gray received his A.B. and M.A. from the University of Colorado Boulder. In October 1942, he was inducted into the United States Army Reserve at Camp Grant, Illinois as a private. After serving in the US Army, he attended the University of Minnesota, where he received his Ph.D. in 1953. He taught at both Colorado and Minnesota was a research assistant at the U.S. Department of Agriculture and was an assistant economist with the Bank of America before joining Stanford in 1954.

Gray's early research concerned the potato market, analyzing the then evident decline in consumption of potatoes, the changing regional pattern of production, and the role of government policy in causing these changes. His research included studies of intertemporal pricing patterns, the causes of market success and failure, the role of speculators and hedgers in futures markets, and whether there is a necessary transfer of a risk premium to speculators. More recently he had studied world food problems, particularly as they relate to trade issues and the appropriate means of dealing with food reserves.

Gray was a consultant for such policy and regulatory bodies as the Chicago Board of Trade, the Food and Agriculture Organization of the United Nations and the Commodity Futures Trading Commission, as well as an expert witness in a number of famous manipulation and tax cases. He was the first to study the feasibility of a futures market in mortgage-backed instruments, the success of which in the 1970s inaugurated the huge growth of the financial futures markets. After his retirement in 1984, he maintained an active schedule as a consultant in the commodities market.

Gray wrote more than 50 professional articles related to commodity futures markets. His major lines of investigation and studies of major regulatory issues affecting futures markets. One study won the American Agricultural Economics Association's annual award for best published research; another was recognized by the Association for its enduring contribution to the literature. Many of his articles continue to be widely used in courses on futures markets.

He published a 1963 study concluding that the Onion Futures Act, which was designed to prevent market manipulation in onion prices by banning onion futures trading, had actually increased onion price volatility.

He died September 5, 1996, in Monterey, California at the age of 76.
