= Paradox of thrift =

Paradox in economics

The paradox of thrift (or paradox of saving) is a paradox of economics. The paradox states that an increase in autonomous saving leads to a decrease in aggregate demand and thus a decrease in gross output which will in turn lower total saving. The paradox is, narrowly speaking, that total saving may fall because of individuals' attempts to increase their saving, and, broadly speaking, that increase in saving may be harmful to an economy. The paradox of thrift is an example of the fallacy of composition, the idea that what is true of the parts must always be true of the whole. The narrow claim transparently contradicts the fallacy, and the broad one does so by implication, because while individual thrift is generally averred to be good for the individual, the paradox of thrift holds that collective thrift may be bad for the economy.

It had been stated as early as 1714 in The Fable of the Bees, and similar sentiments date to antiquity. It was popularized by John Maynard Keynes and is a central component of Keynesian economics.

== The paradox ==
The argument begins from the observation that in equilibrium, total income must equal total output. Assuming that income has a direct effect on saving, an increase in the autonomous component of saving, other things being equal, will move the equilibrium point, at which income equals output to a lower value, thereby inducing a decline in saving that may more than offset the original increase.

In this form it represents a prisoner's dilemma as saving is beneficial to each individual but disadvantageous to the general population. This is a "paradox" because it runs contrary to intuition. Someone unaware of the paradox of thrift would fall into a fallacy of composition and assume that what seems to be good for an individual within the economy will be good for the entire population. However, exercising thrift may be good for an individual by enabling that individual to save for a "rainy day", and yet not be good for the economy as a whole.

This paradox can be explained by analyzing the place, and impact, of increased savings in an economy. If a population decides to save more money at all income levels, then total revenues for companies will decline. This decreased demand causes a contraction of output, giving employers and employees lower income. Eventually the population's total saving will have remained the same or even declined because of lower incomes and a weaker economy. This paradox is based on the proposition, put forth in Keynesian economics, that many economic downturns are demand-based.

== History ==
While the paradox of thrift was popularized by Keynes, and is often attributed to him, it was stated by a number of others prior to Keynes, and the proposition that spending may help and saving may hurt an economy dates to antiquity; similar sentiments occur in the Bible verse:

There is that scattereth, and yet increaseth; and there is that withholdeth more than is meet, but it tendeth to poverty.

— Proverbs 11:24

which has found occasional use as an epigram in underconsumptionist writings.

Keynes himself notes the appearance of the paradox in The Fable of the Bees: or, Private Vices, Publick Benefits (1714) by Bernard Mandeville, the title itself hinting at the paradox, and Keynes citing the passage:

As this prudent economy, which some people call Saving, is in private families the most certain method to increase an estate, so some imagine that, whether a country be barren or fruitful, the same method if generally pursued (which they think practicable) will have the same effect upon a whole nation, and that, for example, the English might be much richer than they are, if they would be as frugal as some of their neighbours. This, I think, is an error.

Keynes suggests Adam Smith was referring to this passage when he wrote "What is prudence in the conduct of every private family can scarce be folly in that of a great Kingdom."

The problem of underconsumption and oversaving, as they saw it, was developed by underconsumptionist economists of the 19th century, and the paradox of thrift in the strict sense that "collective attempts to save yield lower overall savings" was explicitly stated by John M. Robertson in his 1892 book The Fallacy of Saving, writing:

Had the whole population been alike bent on saving, the total saved would positively have been much less, inasmuch as (other tendencies remaining the same) industrial paralysis would have been reached sooner or oftener, profits would be less, interest much lower, and earnings smaller and more precarious. This ... is no idle paradox, but the strictest economic truth.

— John M. Robertson, The Fallacy of Saving, pp. 131–132

Similar ideas were forwarded by William Trufant Foster and Waddill Catchings in the 1920s in The Dilemma of Thrift.

Keynes distinguished between business activity/investment ("Enterprise") and savings ("Thrift") in his Treatise on Money (1930):

mere abstinence is not enough by itself to build cities or drain fens. ... not only may thrift exist without enterprise, but as soon as thrift gets ahead of enterprise, it positively discourages the recovery of enterprise and sets up a vicious circle by its adverse effect on profits. If Enterprise is afoot, wealth accumulates whatever may be happening to Thrift; and if Enterprise is asleep, wealth decays whatever Thrift may be doing.

Thus, Thrift may be the handmaid and nurse of Enterprise. But equally she may not. And, perhaps, even usually she is not.

He stated the paradox of thrift in The General Theory, 1936:

For although the amount of his own saving is unlikely to have any significant influence on his own income, the reactions of the amount of his consumption on the incomes of others makes it impossible for all individuals simultaneously to save any given sums. Every such attempt to save more by reducing consumption will so affect incomes that the attempt necessarily defeats itself. It is, of course, just as impossible for the community as a whole to save less than the amount of current investment, since the attempt to do so will necessarily raise incomes to a level at which the sums which individuals choose to save add up to a figure exactly equal to the amount of investment.

— John Maynard Keynes, The General Theory of Employment, Interest and Money, Chapter 7, p. 84

The theory is referred to as the "paradox of thrift" in Samuelson's influential Economics of 1948, which popularized the term.

=== Paradox of thrift according to Balances Mechanics ===
The paradox of thrift formally can be well described as a circuit paradox using the terms of Balances Mechanics developed by the German economist Wolfgang Stützel (German: Saldenmechanik): It is about saving by cut of expenses, which always leads to a revenue surplus of the individual, so to saving of money. But once the totality (in the meaning of every each) saves at expenses, the revenues of economy only decline.

- Partial sentence: For individual economic entities or a partial group of economy actors it is valid: the lower the expenses the higher the revenue surplus.
- Size mechanics: The expenses decline of a partial group of economy actors can only lead to a revenue surplus if the complementary group does or accepts an expenses surplus.
- Global sentence: A general decline of expenses always leads the totality to a decline of revenues and never to a revenue surplus.

== Related concepts ==
The paradox of thrift has been related to the debt deflation theory of economic crises, being called "the paradox of debt" – people save not to increase savings, but rather to pay down debt. As well, a paradox of toil and a paradox of flexibility have been proposed: A willingness to work more in a liquidity trap and wage flexibility after a debt deflation shock may lead not only to lower wages, but lower employment.

During April 2009, U.S. Federal Reserve Vice Chair Janet Yellen discussed the "Paradox of deleveraging" described by economist Hyman Minsky: "Once this massive credit crunch hit, it didn’t take long before we were in a recession. The recession, in turn, deepened the credit crunch as demand and employment fell, and credit losses of financial institutions surged. Indeed, we have been in the grips of precisely this adverse feedback loop for more than a year. A process of balance sheet deleveraging has spread to nearly every corner of the economy. Consumers are pulling back on purchases, especially on durable goods, to build their savings. Businesses are cancelling planned investments and laying off workers to preserve cash. And, financial institutions are shrinking assets to bolster capital and improve their chances of weathering the current storm. Once again, Minsky understood this dynamic. He spoke of the paradox of deleveraging, in which precautions that may be smart for individuals and firms—and indeed essential to return the economy to a normal state—nevertheless magnify the distress of the economy as a whole."

Sectoral Balances analysis shows the effect of net savings by the private sector. It must either be funded by a public sector deficit or a by a foreign sector deficit which is equivalent to exports being higher than imports for the country analyzed. Therefore, there exists two types of possible equilibriums for a growing economy. Either the public sector is funding the growth of the private sector via a slight deficit or its current account balance is positive and the country is a net exporter of goods and services.

== Criticisms ==
Within mainstream economics, non-Keynesian economists, particularly neoclassical economists, criticize this theory on three principal grounds.

The first criticism is that, following Say's law and the related circle of ideas, if demand slackens, prices will fall (barring government intervention), and the resulting lower price will stimulate demand (though at lower profit or cost – possibly even lower wages). This criticism in turn has been questioned by New Keynesian economists, who reject Say's law and instead point to evidence of sticky prices as a reason why prices do not fall in recession.

The second criticism is that savings represent loanable funds, particularly at banks, assuming the savings are held at banks, rather than currency itself being held ("stashed under one's mattress"). Thus an accumulation of savings yields an increase in potential lending, which will lower interest rates and stimulate borrowing. So a decline in consumer spending is offset by an increase in lending, and subsequent investment and spending.

Two caveats are added to this criticism. Firstly, if savings are held as cash, rather than being loaned out (directly by savers, or indirectly, as via bank deposits), then loanable funds do not increase, and thus a recession may be caused – but this is due to holding cash, not to saving per se. Secondly, banks themselves may hold cash, rather than loaning it out, which results in the growth of excess reserves – funds on deposit but not loaned out. This is argued to occur in liquidity trap situations, when interest rates are at a zero lower bound (or near it) and savings still exceed investment demand. Within Keynesian economics, the desire to hold currency rather than loan it out is discussed under liquidity preference.

Third, the paradox assumes a closed economy in which savings are not invested abroad (to fund exports of local production abroad). Thus, while the paradox may hold at the global level, it need not hold at the local or national level: if one nation increases savings, this can be offset by trading partners consuming a greater amount relative to their own production, i.e., if the saving nation increases exports, and its partners increase imports. This criticism is not very controversial, and is generally accepted by Keynesian economists as well, who refer to it as "exporting one's way out of a recession". They further note that this frequently occurs in concert with currency devaluation (hence increasing exports and decreasing imports), and cannot work as a solution to a global problem, because the global economy is a closed system – not every nation can increase net exports.

=== Austrian School criticism ===
The Austrian School economist Friedrich Hayek criticized the paradox in a 1929 article, "The 'Paradox' of Savings", questioning the paradox as proposed by Foster and Catchings. Hayek, and later Austrian School economists agree that if a population saves more money, total revenues for companies will decline, but they deny the assertion that lower revenues lead to lower economic growth, understanding that the additional savings are used to create more capital to increase production. Once the new, more productive structure of capital has reorganized inside of the current structure, the real costs of production is reduced for most firms. Some criticisms argue that using accumulated capital to increase production is an act which requires spending, and therefore the Austrian argument does not disprove the paradox. However, this confuses spending on capital goods with spending on consumer goods. The paradox only refers to saving by not spending on consumer goods and ignores the productive use of those savings.

== See also ==
- Capitol Hill Babysitting Co-op
- Degrowth
- Frugality
- List of paradoxes
- Social trap
- Vicious circle
- Tragedy of the commons
- In Praise of Idleness and Other Essays, an essay by Bertrand Russell on the subject of the relationships between spending, saving and labour

== References and sources ==
Sources

- Samuelson, Paul & Nordhaus, William (2005). Economics (18th ed.). New York: McGraw-Hill. ISBN 0-07-123932-4.
