= Cornering the market =

Commerce phenomenon

In competition law, cornering the market consists of obtaining sufficient control of a particular stock, commodity, human capital or other asset in an attempt to reduce competition.

Companies that have cornered their markets have usually done so in an attempt to gain greater leeway in their decisions; for example, they may desire to charge higher prices for their products without fears of losing too much business. The cornerer hopes to gain control of enough of the supply of the commodity to be able to set the price for it.

== Strategy and risks ==
Cornering a market can be attempted through several mechanisms. The most direct strategy is to buy a large percentage of the available commodity offered for sale in some spot market and hoard it. With the advent of futures trading, a cornerer may buy a large number of futures contracts on a commodity and then sell them at a profit after inflating the price.

Although there have been many attempts to corner markets by massive purchases in everything from tin to cattle, to date very few of these attempts have ever succeeded; instead, most of these attempted corners have tended to break themselves spontaneously. Indeed, as long ago as 1923, Edwin Lefèvre wrote, "very few of the great corners were profitable to the engineers of them."

A company attempting to corner a market is vulnerable due to the size of its position, which makes it highly susceptible to market risk. By its nature, cornering a market requires a company to purchase commodities or their derivatives at artificial prices; this effectively creates a situation where other investors attempt to profit off of these machinations through arbitrage. This has a chilling effect on the cornering attempt, since these investors usually take positions opposed to the cornerer. Furthermore, if the price starts to move against the cornerer, any attempt by the cornerer to sell would likely cause the price to drop substantially, subjecting the cornerer to catastrophic risk.

In nearly all cases, the company simply runs out of money and disbands before getting close to controlling prices. In the few cases where companies have purchased a dominant position in a market, governments and exchanges have intervened. Cornering a market is often considered unethical by the general public and has highly undesirable effects on the economy.

== Historical examples ==
=== Thales of Miletus (c. 6th century BC) ===
According to Aristotle in The Politics (Book I Section 1259a), Thales of Miletus once cornered the market in olive-oil presses:

Thales, so the story goes, because of his poverty was taunted with the uselessness of philosophy; but from his knowledge of astronomy he had observed while it was still winter that there was going to be a large crop of olives, so he raised a small sum of money and paid round deposits for the whole of the olive-presses in Miletus and Chios, which he hired at a low rent as nobody was running him up; and when the season arrived, there was a sudden demand for a number of presses at the same time, and by letting them out on what terms he liked he realized a large sum of money, so proving that it is easy for philosophers to be rich if they choose.

=== 19th century: Classic examples by Edwin Lefèvre ===
Journalist Edwin Lefèvre lists several examples of corners from the mid-19th century. He distinguishes corners as the result of manipulations from corners as the result of competitive buying.

==== James Fisk, Jay Gould and the Black Friday (1869) ====
The 1869 Black Friday financial panic in the United States was caused by the efforts of Jay Gould and James Fisk to corner the gold market on the New York Gold Exchange. When the government gold hit the market, the premium plummeted within minutes and many investors were ruined. Fisk and Gould escaped significant financial harm.

==== Lefèvre thoughts on corners of the old days ====
In chapter 19 of his book, Edwin Lefèvre tries to summarize the rationale for the corners of the 19th century.

A wise old broker told me that all the big operators of the 60s and 70s had one ambition, and that was to work a corner. In many cases this was the offspring of vanity; in others, of the desire for revenge. [...] It was more than the prospective money profit that prompted the engineers of corners to do their damnedest. It was the vanity complex asserting itself among cold-bloodest operators.

=== 20th century: The Northern Pacific Railway ===
The corner of The Northern Pacific Railway on May 9, 1901, is a well documented case of competitive buying, resulting in a panic. The 2009 Annotated Edition of Reminiscences of a Stock Operator contains Lefèvre's original account in chapter 3 as well as modern annotations explaining the actual locations and personalities on the page margins.

=== 1900s: The United Copper Company ===
In October of 1907, a failed attempt by F. Augustus Heinze to corner The United Copper Company led to the panic of 1907. A 50% fall in the New York Stock Exchange of the previous year was directly related to the event.

=== 1920s: The Stutz Motor Company ===
Called "a forerunner of the Livermore and Cutten operations of a few years later" by historian Robert Sobel, the March 1920 corner of The Stutz Motor Company is an example of a manipulated corner ruining everyone involved, especially its originator Allan Ryan.

=== 1950s: The onion market ===
In the late 1950s, United States onion farmers alleged that Sam Seigel and Vincent Kosuga, Chicago Mercantile Exchange traders, were attempting to corner the market on onions. Their complaints resulted in the passage of the Onion Futures Act, which banned trading in onion futures in the United States and remains in effect as of 3 December 2025.

=== 1970s: The Hunt brothers and the silver market ===
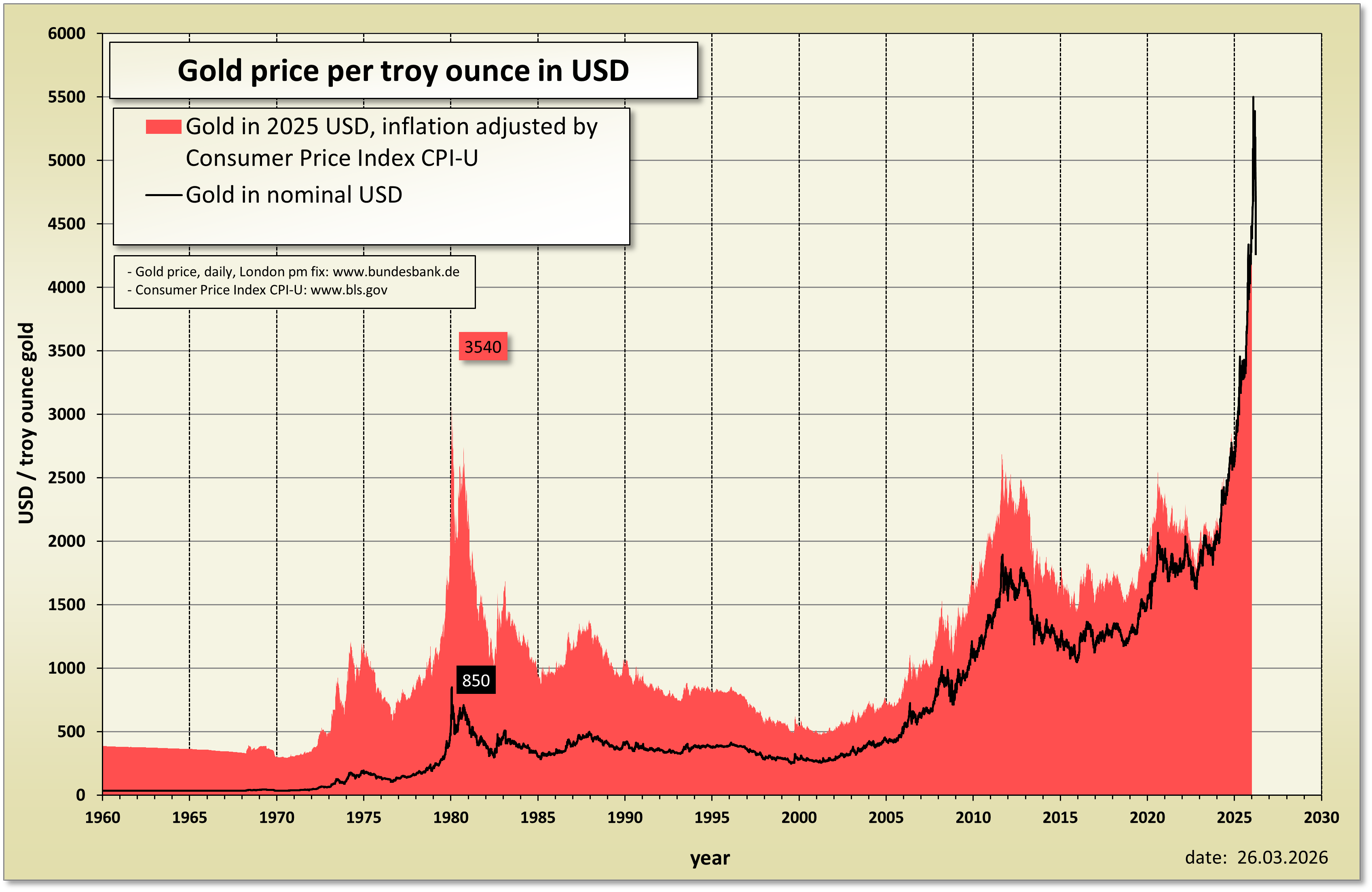
Following an attempt at cornering the silver market by the Hunt brothers in 1980, gold and silver prices briefly spiked in an event referred to as Silver Thursday.

Brothers Nelson Bunker Hunt and William Herbert Hunt attempted to corner the world silver markets in the late 1970s and early 1980s, at one stage holding the rights to more than half of the world's deliverable silver. During the Hunts' accumulation of the precious metal, silver prices rose from $11 an ounce in September 1979 to nearly $50 an ounce in January 1980. Silver prices ultimately collapsed to below $11 an ounce two months later, much of the fall occurring on a single day now known as Silver Thursday, due to changes made to exchange rules regarding the purchase of commodities on margin.

=== 1990s: Hamanaka and the copper market ===
Rogue trader Yasuo Hamanaka, Sumitomo Corporation's chief copper trader, attempted to corner the international copper market over a ten-year period leading up to 1996. As his scheme collapsed, Sumitomo was left with large positions in the copper market, ultimately losing US$2.6 billion. Hamanaka confessed in June 1996, and pleaded guilty to criminal charges stemming from his trading activity in 1997. A Tokyo court sentenced him to eight years in prison.

=== 2008: Porsche and shares in Volkswagen ===
During the 2008 financial crisis, Porsche cornered the market in shares of Volkswagen, which briefly saw Volkswagen become the world's most valuable company. Porsche claimed that its actions were intended to gain control of Volkswagen rather than to manipulate the market: in this case, while cornering the market in Volkswagen shares, Porsche contracted with naked shorts—resulting in a short squeeze on them. It was ultimately unsuccessful, leading to the resignation of Porsche's chief executive and financial director and to the merger of Porsche into Volkswagen.

One of the wealthiest men in Germany's industry, Adolf Merckle, died by suicide after shorting Volkswagen shares.

=== 2010: Armajaro and the European cocoa market ===
On July 17, 2010, Armajaro purchased 240,100 tonnes of cocoa, the largest single cocoa trade in 14 years. The buyout caused cocoa prices to rise to their highest level since 1977. The purchase was valued at £658 million and accounted for 7 percent of annual global cocoa production.

Anthony Ward, co-founder and manager of Armajaro, was dubbed "Chocfinger" by fellow traders for his exploits. The nickname is a reference to both the Bond villain Goldfinger and a British confection.

== See also ==
- Barriers to entry
- Bottleneck (production)
- Essential facilities doctrine
- Raising rivals' costs
- Supply chain
