= Jerry Markham =

American academic

Jerry W. Markham is a professor at the Florida International University College of Law, and a legal scholar on business organizations and securities regulation in the United States. He has been quoted or cited as an expert on the regulation of financial and commodities markets in a wide variety of news sources, and his three-volume collection, A Financial History of the United States, has also been cited authoritatively.

== Education and professional activities ==
Markham received a B.S. from Western Kentucky University, and attended law school at the University of Kentucky College of Law, where he served as editor-in-chief of the Kentucky Law Journal, and was named to the Order of the Coif. He later received an LL.M. from the Georgetown University Law Center.

Before entering academia, Markham was secretary and counsel of Cboe Global Markets, chief counsel, Division of Enforcement of the United States Commodity Futures Trading Commission, an attorney for the United States Securities and Exchange Commission, and a partner with the international firm of Rogers & Wells (now Clifford Chance) in Washington, D.C.

== Scholarship ==
Markham has written and taught in the areas of corporate finance, banking, commodities trading, securities and international trade law. He is currently a professor of law at the Florida International University College of Law. Markham was previously a member of the law faculty at the University of North Carolina, where he taught for twelve years, and prior to that was an adjunct professor at the Georgetown University Law Center for ten years.

Markham authored a three-volume financial history of the United States that was selected as a Choice Outstanding Academic Title in 2002. He has co-authored four casebooks on corporate law and banking regulation, has published a two-volume treatise and a history book on the law of commodity futures regulation, and was the principal coauthor of a two-volume treatise on securities regulation. More recently, he authored a book on the Enron and other financial scandals that followed the market downturn in 2000.

Markham has been a lecturer at the Université Jean Moulin in Lyon, France, and also has lectured in Sydney, Warsaw, Beijing, Mexico City, Montevideo, Fukuoka, and Bangkok.

== Works ==
=== Treatises ===
- The History of Commodity Futures Trading and Its Regulation (1987)
- A Financial History of the United States (2002; in three volumes)
- A Financial History of Modern U.S. Corporate Scandals: From Enron to Reform (2006)
- Broker Dealer Operations Under Securities and Commodities Law (1995; with Thomas Lee Hazen)
- Broker-dealer Operations and Regulation Under Securities and Commodities Laws (2002; with Thomas Lee Hazen)

=== Textbooks ===
- Commodities Regulation: Fraud, Manipulation & Other Claims (1987; Clark Boardman Callaghan)
- Mergers, Acquisitions and Other Business Combinations: Cases and Materials (2003; with Thomas Lee Hazen)
- Corporations and Other Business Enterprises: Cases and Materials (2003, 2006; with Thomas Lee Hazen)
- Regulation of Bank Financial Service Activities: Cases and Materials (2004; with Lissa Lamkin Broome)
- Corporate Finance: Cases and Materials (2004; with Thomas Lee Hazen)

=== Law-Review Articles ===
- Jerry W. Markham, U.S. Securities and Exchange Commission and the "Deep Administrative State": A Case Study of Its ESG Rules, 14 AM. U. BUS. L. REV. 151 (2024).
