= Waddill Catchings =

American economist (1879–1967)

Waddill Catchings (September 6, 1879 – December 31, 1967) was an American economist who collaborated with his Harvard classmate William Trufant Foster in a series of economics books that were highly influential in the United States in the 1920s. His influential books, written with Foster, were Money (1923), Profits (1925), Business Without a Buyer (1927), The Road to Plenty (1928), and Progress and Plenty (1930). The books influenced many policy makers, including Herbert Hoover and Marriner Eccles. Catchings graduated from Harvard.

== Life and career ==
He was a leading banker and financier in the 1910s and 1920s, making (and losing) a fortune of over $250 million. By 1931 he had nearly bankrupted his employer, Goldman Sachs, through his formation of the Goldman Sachs Trading Company and its floating of the Shenandoah & Blue Ridge investment trusts, controlled by Harrison Williams. Catchings was a director of major corporations in diverse fields, including leather, motion pictures (Warner Brothers), radio, television, recorded music (Muzak Holdings), tin cans, dry goods, rubber, pharmaceuticals, automobiles (Studebaker and Chrysler), typewriters, breakfast cereals, lumber, mail-order merchandising, music publishing, and electric power.

== Influence ==
A superb phrase maker and popularizer, he had a major impact on Franklin D. Roosevelt. For example, Roosevelt's talk of a nation "one-third ill-fed, ill-clothed, ill-housed" used one of Catchings' expressions.

With Foster, he was one of the leading pre-Keynesian economists, in the underconsumptionist tradition, advocating similar issues to Keynes such as the paradox of thrift and economic interventionism. The two are now rarely mentioned in contemporary economics texts, standing as they do in the shadow of Keynes's The General Theory.

== Sources ==
- Barber, William J. (1985). From New Era to New Deal: Herbert Hoover, the Economists, and American Economic Policy, 1921–1933. New York: Cambridge University Press. ISBN 0-521-30526-8.
- Dorfman, Joseph (1959). The Economic Mind in American Civilization. Vol. 4. New York: Viking Press. pp. 339–351.
- Gleason, Alan H. (1959). "Foster and Catchings: A Reappraisal". Journal of Political Economy. 67 (2): 156–172. doi:10.1086/258158. JSTOR 1825391. S2CID 153358804.
- Introducing Foster and Catchings at Reviving Growth Keynesianism
