= William Trufant Foster =

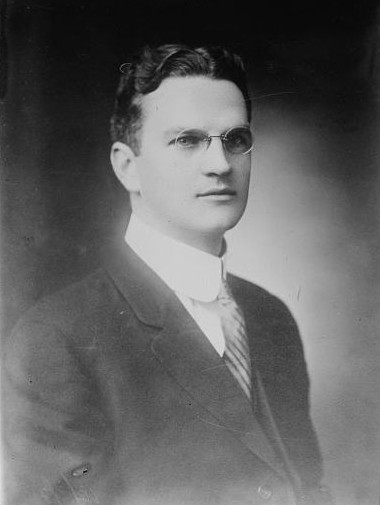
William Trufant Foster

William Trufant Foster (January 18, 1879 – October 8, 1950) was an American educator and economist, whose theories were especially influential in the 1920s. He was the first president of Reed College.

== Early life and education ==
Foster was born in Boston, Massachusetts, on January 18, 1879. He attended Roxbury High School in Boston. He graduated from Harvard University with an A.B. in 1901 and an A.M. in 1904.

== Career ==
Foster was an instructor of English at Bates College in Maine, from 1901 to 1903 and served as a coach of Bates' internationally known debate program. Foster was also professor of English and Argumentation at Bowdoin College in Maine in 1905. He authored "Argumentation and Debating", published in 1908. Foster eventually received a Ph.D. in 1911 from Teachers College, Columbia University.

His conception of "the ideal college" set out in the concluding chapter of his dissertation, led to his appointment as the first president of Reed College. He served from 1911 to 1919. He rejected intercollegiate sports and Greek life in favor of an intense academic education. He fostered close intellectual collaboration between faculty and students. He treated undergraduates as if they were graduate students and created a system of small seminars, comprehensive examinations, undergraduate research, and senior theses.

He was director of the Pollak Foundation of Economic Research from 1920 to 1950, in Newton, Massachusetts, where he emphasized the need to protect consumer interests.

== Economics ==
He collaborated with his Harvard classmate Waddill Catchings in a series of economics books that were highly influential in the United States in the 1920s. His influential books, written with Catchings, were Money (1923), Profits (1925), Business Without a Buyer (1927), The Road to Plenty (1928), and Progress and Plenty (1930).

With Catchings, he was one of the leading pre-Keynesian economists, in the underconsumptionist tradition, advocating similar issues to Keynes such as the paradox of thrift and economic interventionism. The two are now rarely mentioned in contemporary economics texts, standing as they do in the shadow of Keynes's The General Theory.

Foster and Catchings rejected traditional laissez-faire economics and called for aggressive federal involvement to balance the economy lest destabilizing forces upset prosperity. The main problem was underconsumption, which could be overcome by strategic government spending in public works. The theory strongly influenced the anti-depression programs of Herbert Hoover, Franklin D. Roosevelt, and Federal Reserve Board Chairman Marriner Eccles.

== See also ==
- Barber, William J. (1985). From New Era to New Deal: Herbert Hoover, the Economists, and American Economic Policy, 1921–1933. New York: Cambridge University Press. ISBN 0-521-30526-8.
- Dorfman, Joseph (1959). The Economic Mind in American Civilization. Vol. 4. New York: Viking Press. pp. 339–351.
- Gleason, Alan H. (1959). "Foster and Catchings: A Reappraisal". Journal of Political Economy. 67 (2): 156–172. doi:10.1086/258158. JSTOR 1825391. S2CID 153358804.
