= Underconsumption =

Economic stagnation from inadequate consumer demand

Underconsumption is a theory in economics that recessions and stagnation arise from an inadequate consumer demand, relative to the amount produced. In other words, there is a problem of overproduction and overinvestment during a demand crisis. The theory formed the basis for the development of Keynesian economics and the theory of aggregate demand after the 1930s.

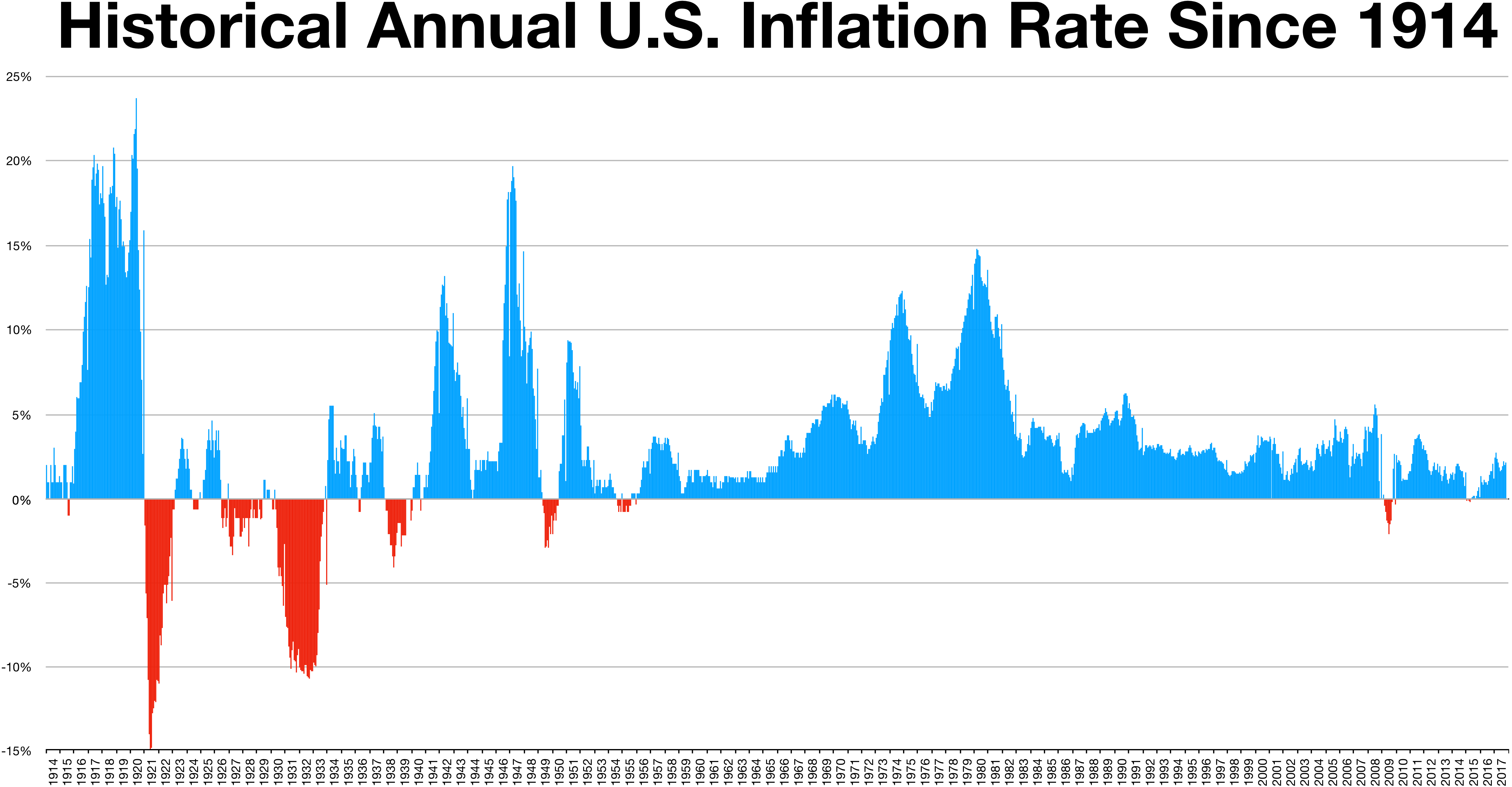

Underconsumption theory narrowly refers to heterodox economists in Britain in the 19th century, particularly from 1815 onwards, who advanced the theory of underconsumption and rejected classical economics in the form of Ricardian economics. The economists did not form a unified school, and their theories were rejected by mainstream economics of the time.

Underconsumption is an old concept in economics that goes back to the 1598 French mercantilist text Les Trésors et richesses pour mettre l'Estat en splendeur (The Treasures and riches to put the State in splendor) by Barthélemy de Laffemas, if not earlier. The concept of underconsumption had been used repeatedly as part of the criticism of Say's law until underconsumption theory was largely replaced by Keynesian economics which points to a more complete explanation of the failure of aggregate demand to attain potential output, i.e., the level of production corresponding to full employment.

One of the early underconsumption theories says that because workers are paid a wage less than they produce, they cannot buy back as much as they produce. Thus, there will always be inadequate demand for the product.

== Theory ==
In his book Underconsumption Theories from 1976, Michael Bleaney defined two main elements of classical (pre-Keynesian) underconsumption theory. First, the only source of recessions, stagnation, and other aggregate demand failures was inadequate consumer demand. Second, a capitalist economy tends toward a state of persistent depression because of this. Thus, underconsumption is not seen as part of business cycles as much as (perhaps) the general economic environment in which they occur. Compare to the tendency of the rate of profit to fall, which has a similar belief in stagnation as the natural (stable) state, but which is otherwise distinct and in critical opposition to underconsumption theory.

=== Keynesian ===
Modern Keynesian economics has largely superseded underconsumption theories. Falling consumer demand need not cause a recession, since other parts of aggregate demand may rise to counteract this effect. These other elements are private fixed investment in factories, machines, and housing, government purchases of goods and services, and exports (net of imports). Further, few economists believe that persistent stagnation is the normal state toward which a capitalist economy tends. But it is possible in Keynesian economics that falling consumption (say, due to low and falling real wages) can cause a recession or deepening stagnation.

=== Marxian ===
The case is frequently made that Marx's position towards underconsumption is ambivalent. On the one hand, he wrote that "the last cause of all real crises always remains the poverty and restricted consumption of the masses as compared to the tendency of capitalist production to develop the productive forces in such a way that only the absolute power of consumption of the entire society would be their limit."

However, in Volume II of Das Kapital, he provides the following critique of underconsumptionist theory: "It is sheer redundancy to say that crises are produced by the lack of paying consumption or paying consumers. The capitalist system recognizes only paying consumers, with the exception of those in receipt of poor law support or the 'rogues.' When commodities are unsalable, it means simply that there are no purchasers, or consumers, for them. When people attempt to give this redundancy an appearance of some deeper meaning by saying that the working class does not receive enough of its own product and that the evil would be dispelled immediately it received a greater share, i.e., if its wages were increased, all one can say is that crises are invariably preceded by periods in which wages in general rise and the working class receives a relatively greater share of the annual product intended for consumption. From the standpoint of these valiant upholders of 'plain common sense,' such periods should prevent the coming of crises. It would appear, therefore, that capitalist production includes conditions which are independent of good will or bad will. . ." Marx argued that the primary source of capitalist crisis was not located in the realm of consumption, but rather, in production. In general, as Anwar Shaikh has argued, production creates the basis for consumption, because it puts purchasing power into the hands of workers and fellow capitalists. To produce anything requires the individual capitalist to buy machines (capital goods) and employ workers.

In Volume III, Part III of Das Kapital, Marx presents a theory of crisis which is solidly grounded in the contradictions he sees in the realm of capitalist production: the Tendency of the rate of profit to fall. He argues that as the capitalists compete with each other, they strive to replace human laborers with machines. This raises what Marx called "the organic composition of capital." However, capitalist profit is based upon living, not "dead" (i.e., machine) labor. Thus as the organic composition of capital rises, the rate of profit tends to fall. Eventually, this will cause a fall in the mass of profit, giving way to decline and crisis.

Many advocates of Marxian economics reject underconsumptionist stagnation theories. However, Marxian economist James Devine has pointed to two possible roles for underconsumption in the business cycle and the origins of the Great Depression of the 1930s.

First, he interprets the dynamics of the U.S. economy in the 1920s as being one of over-investment relative to demand. Stagnant wages (relative to labor productivity) mean that working-class consumer spending also stagnates. As noted above, this does not mean that the economy as a whole must dwell in the economic cellar. In the 1920s, private fixed investment soared, as did "luxury consumption" by the capitalists, boosted by high profits and optimistic expectations. Some growth of working-class consumption occurred, but corresponded to increased indebtedness. (In theory, the government and foreign sectors could have also counteracted stagnation, but this did not happen in that era.) The problem with this kind of economic boom is that it becomes increasingly unstable, somewhat akin to a bubble affecting a financial market. Eventually (in 1929), the over-investment boom ended, leaving unused industrial capacity and debt obligations, discouraging immediate recovery. Note that Devine does not see all booms in these terms. In the late 1960s, the U.S. saw "over-investment relative to supply," in which abundant accumulation pulls up wages and raw material costs, depressing the rate of profit on the supply side.

Second, once a recession has occurred (e.g., 1931–33), private investment can be blocked by debt, unused capacity, pessimistic expectations, and increasing social unrest. In this case, capitalists try to raise their rates of profit by cutting wages and raising labor productivity (by speeding up production). The problem is that while this may be rational for the individual, it is irrational for the capitalist class as a whole. Cutting wages relative to productivity lowers consumer demand relative to potential output. With other sources of aggregate demand blocked, this actually hurts profitability by lowering demand. Devine terms this problem the "under-consumption trap".

== History ==
=== 16th century through 18th century – mercantilism ===
Underconsumption theory dates to the earlier economic theory of mercantilism, and an early history of underconsumptionism is given in Mercantilism by Eli Heckscher Underconsumption was a small part of mercantilist theory, in Heckscher's view, but was discussed by a number of authors.

The earliest reference given was to Barthélemy de Laffemas, who in 1598 in The Treasures and riches to put the State in splendor "denounced the objectors to the use of French silks on the ground that all purchasers of French luxury goods created a livelihood for the poor, whereas the miser caused them to die in distress," an early form of the paradox of thrift. A number of other 17th century authors, English, German, and French, stated similar sentiments, which Heckscher summarizes as:

"the deep-rooted belief in the utility of luxury and the evil of thrift. Thrift, in fact, was regarded as the cause of unemployment, and for two reasons: in the first place, because real income was believed to diminish by the amount of money which did not enter into exchange, and secondly, because saving was believed to withdraw money from circulation."

The Fable of The Bees by Bernard Mandeville, of 1714, was credited by Keynes as the most popular exposition of underconsumptionism of its time, but it caused such an uproar, being seen as an attack against Christian virtues, specifically attacking temperance, that underconsumptionism was not mentioned in "respectable circles" for another century, until it was raised in the later Malthus.

=== 19th century ===
Malthus devoted a chapter of Principles (1836) to underconsumption theory, which was rebutted by David Ricardo, in his Notes on Malthus, and which debate continued in private correspondence.

Malthus was credited by Keynes as a predecessor for his views on effective demand and, other than Malthus, Keynes did not credit the existence of other proponents of underconsumption, stating instead that Ricardo "conquered" English economics. This is now understood to be false – other British proponents of underconsumption are now well-established, but, as Keynes demonstrated, they were poorly documented, and by the 1930s not well-known. Further, they did not form a unified school, but rather related heterodox ideas.

The Birmingham School of economists argued an underconsumptionist theory from 1815, and some of the writings of the school's leading member Thomas Attwood contained formulations of the multiplier effect and an income-expenditure model.

In continental Europe, Jean Charles Léonard de Sismondi proposed underconsumption and overproduction as causes of the economic cycle, in his Nouveaux Principes d'économie politique (1819), in one of the earliest systematic treatments of economic cycles. Properly, Sismondi discussed periodic economic crises, while the notion of a cycle was devised by Charles Dunoyer in his reconciliation of Sismondi's work with classical economics.

The multiplier dates to work in the 1890s by the Australian economist Alfred De Lissa, the Danish politician Julius Wulff, and the German-American economist Nicholas Johannsen, Nicholas Johannsen also proposed a theory of effective demand in the 1890s.

The paradox of thrift was stated in 1892 by John M. Robertson in his The Fallacy of Savings, and similar sentiments date to antiquity, in addition to the mercantilist statements cited above:

There is that scattereth, and yet increaseth; and there is that withholdeth more than is meet, but it tendeth to poverty.

The liberal soul shall be made fat: and he that watereth shall be watered also himself.

— Proverbs 11:24–25

=== 20th century – pre-Keynes ===
An underconsumption theory of the economic cycle was given by John A. Hobson in his Industrial System (1910).

William Trufant Foster and Waddill Catchings developed a theory of underconsumption in the 1920s that became highly influential among policy makers. The argument was that governmental intervention, especially spending on public works programs, was essential to restore the balance between production and consumption. The theory strongly influenced Herbert Hoover and Franklin D. Roosevelt to engage in massive public works projects.

=== Legacy ===
Today these ideas, regardless of provenance, are grouped in academia under the rubric of "Keynesian economics", due to Keynes's role in consolidating, elaborating, and popularizing them. Keynes himself specifically discussed underconsumption (which he wrote "under-consumption") in The General Theory of Employment, Interest and Money.

== Criticism ==
The theory of underconsumption has been criticized by classical economists such as James Mill and Adam Smith, and on grounds of Christian morality. These criticisms were revised by Austrian economics.

== See also ==
- Austerity
- Demand shortfall – microeconomic
- Flooding the market
- Paradox of thrift

== Bibliography ==
- William J. Barber. Herbert Hoover, the Economists, and American Economic Policy, 1921–1933 (1985)
- Michael Bleaney Underconsumption Theories: A History and Critical Analysis Lawrence & Wishart (1976)
- Joseph Dorfman, The Economic Mind in American Civilization (1959) vol 5 pp 339–351
- Alan H. Gleason, "Foster and Catchings: A Reappraisal," Journal of Political Economy (Apr. 1959). 67:156+
- Paul Mattick Marx & Keynes: The Limits of the Mixed Economy Merlin Press (1971)
