= Commodity Exchange Authority =

The Commodity Exchange Authority was a former regulatory agency of USDA. It was established to administer the Commodity Exchange Act of 1936; it was the predecessor to the Commodity Futures Trading Commission (CFTC).
