= Still life =

Type of painting

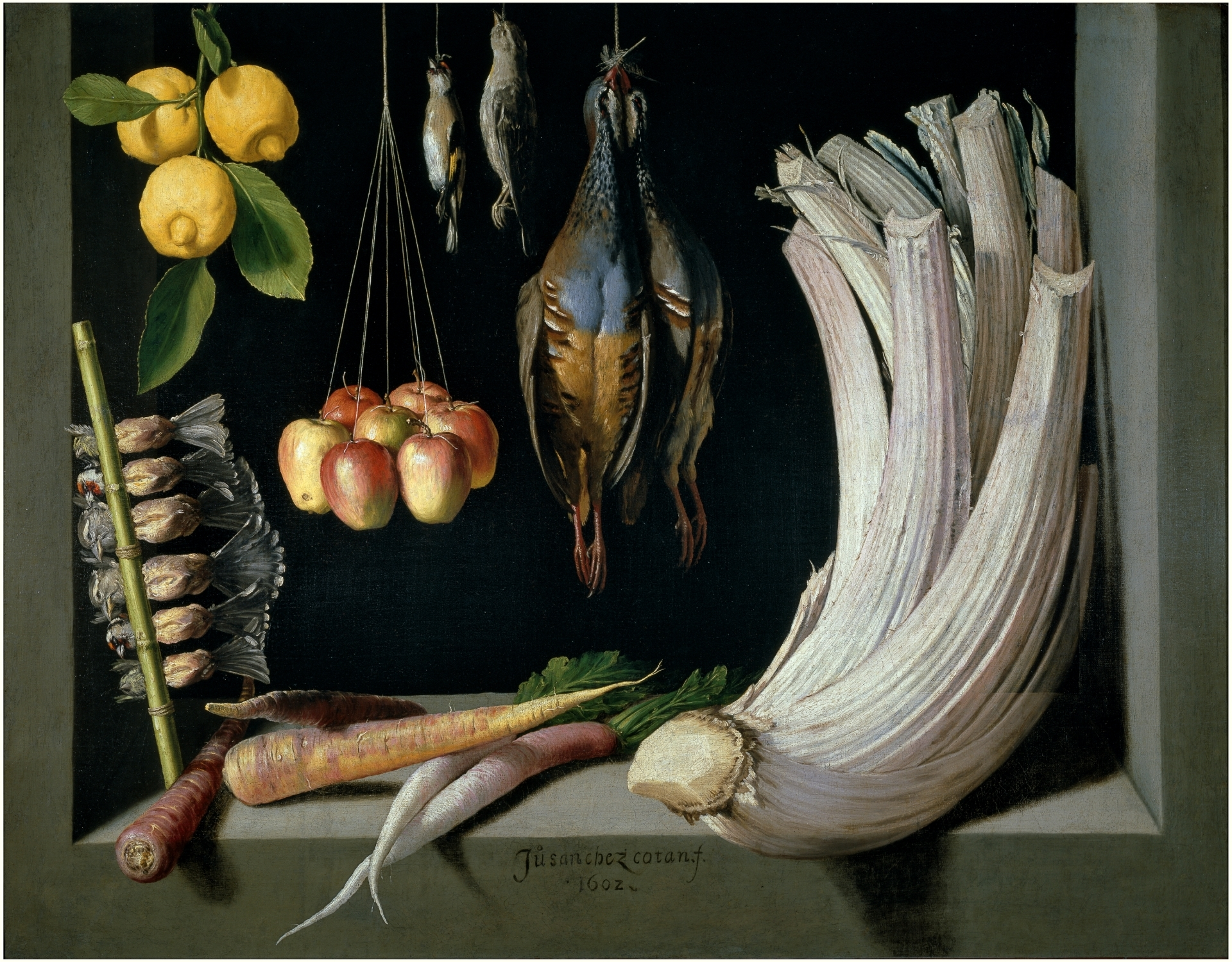
Juan Sánchez Cotán, Still Life with Game Fowl, Vegetables and Fruits (1602), Museo del Prado, Madrid

A still life (pl.: still lifes) is a work of art depicting mostly inanimate subject matter, typically commonplace objects which are either natural (food, flowers, dead animals, plants, rocks, shells, etc.) or human-made (drinking glasses, books, vases, jewelry, coins, pipes, etc.).

With origins in Ancient Greco-Roman art and the Middle Ages, still-life painting emerged as a distinct genre and professional specialization in Western painting by the late 16th century, and has remained significant since then. One advantage of the still-life artform is that it allows an artist much freedom to experiment with the arrangement of elements within a composition of a painting. Still life, as a particular genre, began with Netherlandish painting of the 16th and 17th centuries, and the English term still life derives from the Dutch word stilleven. Early still-life paintings, particularly before 1700, often contained religious and allegorical symbolism relating to the objects depicted. Later still-life works are produced with a variety of media and technology, such as found objects, photography, computer graphics, as well as video and sound.

The term includes the painting of dead animals, especially game. Live ones are considered animal art, although in practice they were often painted from dead models. Because of the use of plants and animals as a subject, the still-life category also shares commonalities with zoological and especially botanical illustration. However, with visual or fine art, the work is not intended merely to illustrate the subject correctly.

Still life occupied the lowest rung of the hierarchy of genres, but has been extremely popular with buyers. As well as the independent still-life subject, still-life painting encompasses other types of painting with prominent still-life elements, usually symbolic, and "images that rely on a multitude of still-life elements ostensibly to reproduce a 'slice of life'". The trompe-l'œil painting, which intends to deceive the viewer into thinking the scene is real, is a specialized type of still life, usually showing inanimate and relatively flat objects.

== Antecedents and development ==
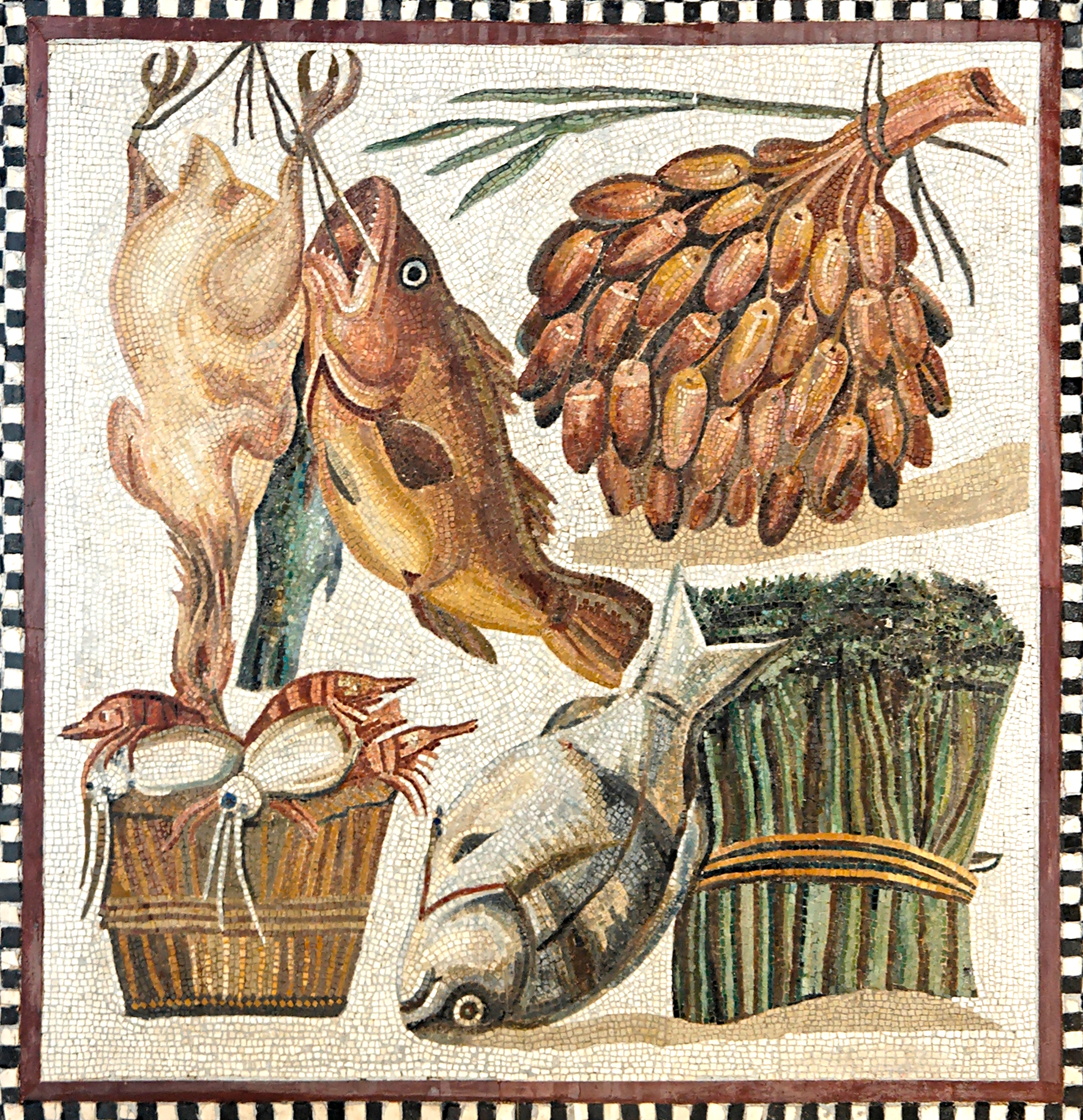
Still life on a 2nd-century mosaic, with fish, poultry, dates and vegetables from the Vatican museum

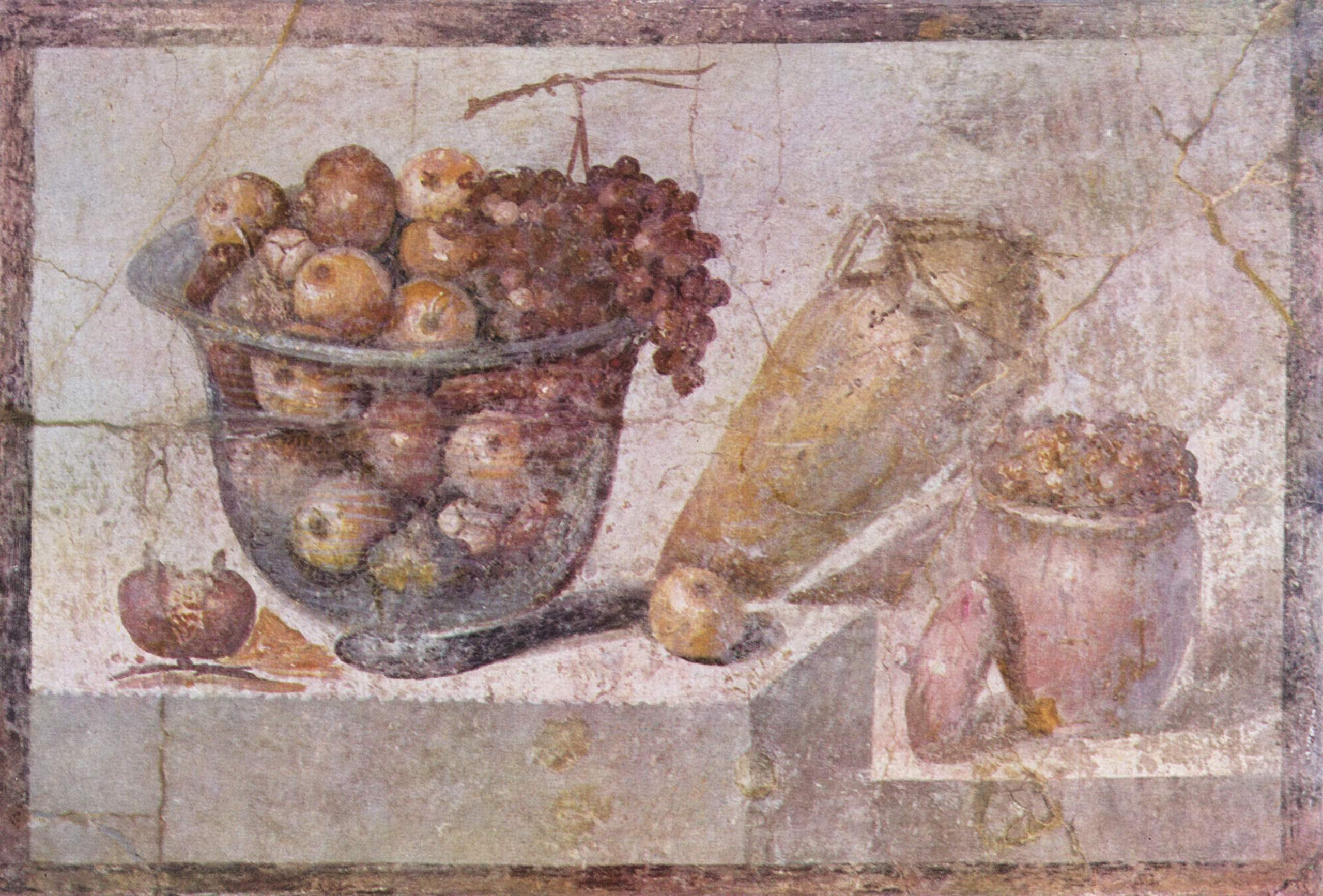
Glass bowl of fruit and vases. Roman wall painting in Pompeii (around 70 AD), Naples National Archaeological Museum, Naples, Italy

Still-life paintings often adorn the interior of ancient Egyptian tombs. It was believed that food objects and other items depicted there would, in the afterlife, become real and available for use by the deceased. Ancient Greek vase paintings also demonstrate great skill in depicting everyday objects and animals. Peiraikos is mentioned by Pliny the Elder as a panel painter of "low" subjects, such as survive in mosaic versions and provincial wall-paintings at Pompeii: "barbers' shops, cobblers' stalls, asses, eatables and similar subjects".

Similar still life, more simply decorative in intent, but with realistic perspective, have also been found in the Roman wall paintings and floor mosaics unearthed at Pompeii, Herculaneum and the Villa Boscoreale, including the later familiar motif of a glass bowl of fruit. Decorative mosaics termed "emblema", found in the homes of rich Romans, demonstrated the range of food enjoyed by the upper classes, and also functioned as signs of hospitality and as celebrations of the seasons and of life.

By the 16th century, food and flowers would again appear as symbols of the seasons and of the five senses. Also starting in Roman times is the tradition of the use of the skull in paintings as a symbol of mortality and earthly remains, often with the accompanying phrase Omnia mors aequat (Death makes all equal). These vanitas images have been re-interpreted through the last 400 years of art history, starting with Dutch painters around 1600.

The popular appreciation of the realism of still-life painting is related in the ancient Greek legend of Zeuxis and Parrhasius, who are said to have once competed to create the most lifelike objects, history's earliest descriptions of trompe-l'œil painting. As Pliny the Elder recorded in ancient Roman times, Greek artists centuries earlier were already advanced in the arts of portrait painting, genre painting and still life. He singled out Peiraikos, "whose artistry is surpassed by only a very few...He painted barbershops and shoemakers' stalls, donkeys, vegetables, and such, and for that reason came to be called the 'painter of vulgar subjects'; yet these works are altogether delightful, and they were sold at higher prices than the greatest [paintings] of many other artists."

=== Middle Ages and Early Renaissance ===
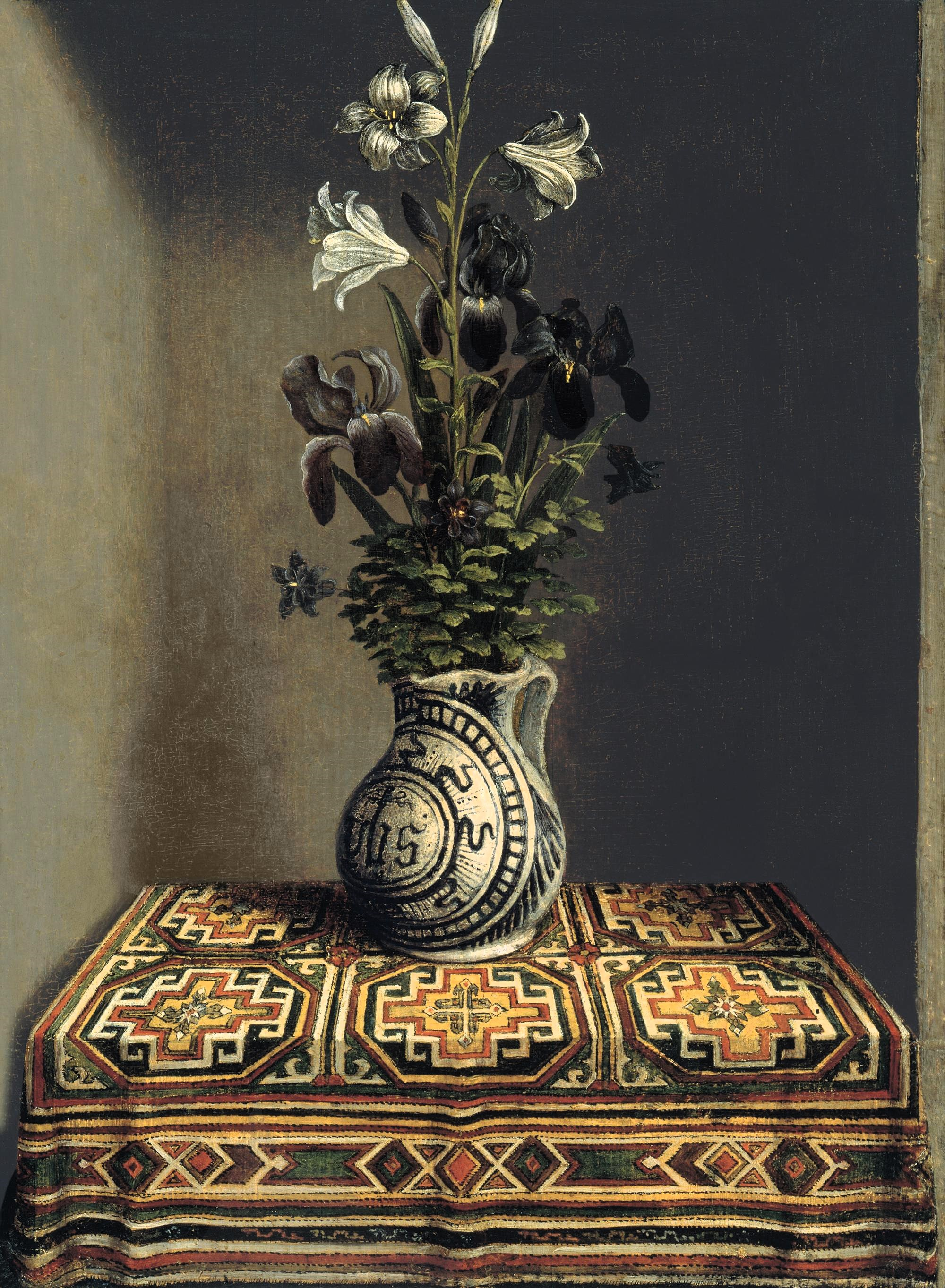
Hans Memling (1430–1494), Vase of Flowers (1480), Museo Thyssen-Bornemisza, Madrid. According to some scholars the Vase of Flowers is filled with religious symbolism.

By 1300, starting with Giotto and his pupils, still-life painting was revived in the form of fictional niches on religious wall paintings which depicted everyday objects. Through the Middle Ages and the Renaissance, still life in Western art remained primarily an adjunct to Christian religious subjects, and convened religious and allegorical meaning. This was particularly true in the work of Northern European artists, whose fascination with highly detailed optical realism and symbolism led them to lavish great attention on their paintings' overall message. Painters like Jan van Eyck often used still-life elements as part of an iconographic program.

In the late Middle Ages, still-life elements, mostly flowers but also animals and sometimes inanimate objects, were painted with increasing realism in the borders of illuminated manuscripts, developing models and technical advances that were used by painters of larger images. There was considerable overlap between the artists making miniatures for manuscripts and those painting panels, especially in Early Netherlandish painting. The Hours of Catherine of Cleves, probably made in Utrecht around 1440, is one of the outstanding examples of this trend, with borders featuring an extraordinary range of objects, including coins and fishing-nets, chosen to complement the text or main image at that particular point. Flemish workshops later in the century took the naturalism of border elements even further. Gothic millefleur tapestries are another example of the general increasing interest in accurate depictions of plants and animals. The set of The Lady and the Unicorn is the best-known example, designed in Paris around 1500 and then woven in Flanders.

The development of oil painting technique by Jan van Eyck and other Northern European artists made it possible to paint everyday objects in this hyper-realistic fashion, owing to the slow drying, mixing, and layering qualities of oil colours. Among the first to break free of religious meaning were Leonardo da Vinci, who created watercolour studies of fruit (around 1495) as part of his restless examination of nature, and Albrecht Dürer who also made precise coloured drawings of flora and fauna.

Petrus Christus' portrait of a bride and groom visiting a goldsmith is a typical example of a transitional still life depicting both religious and secular content. Though mostly allegorical in message, the figures of the couple are realistic and the objects shown (coins, vessels, etc.) are accurately painted but the goldsmith is actually a depiction of St. Eligius and the objects heavily symbolic. Another similar type of painting is the family portrait combining figures with a well-set table of food, which symbolizes both the piety of the human subjects and their thanks for God's abundance. Around this time, simple still-life depictions divorced of figures (but not allegorical meaning) were beginning to be painted on the outside of shutters of private devotional paintings. Another step toward the autonomous still life was the painting of symbolic flowers in vases on the back of secular portraits around 1475. Jacopo de' Barbari went a step further with his Still Life with Partridge and Gauntlets (1504), among the earliest signed and dated trompe-l'œil still-life paintings, which contains minimal religious content.

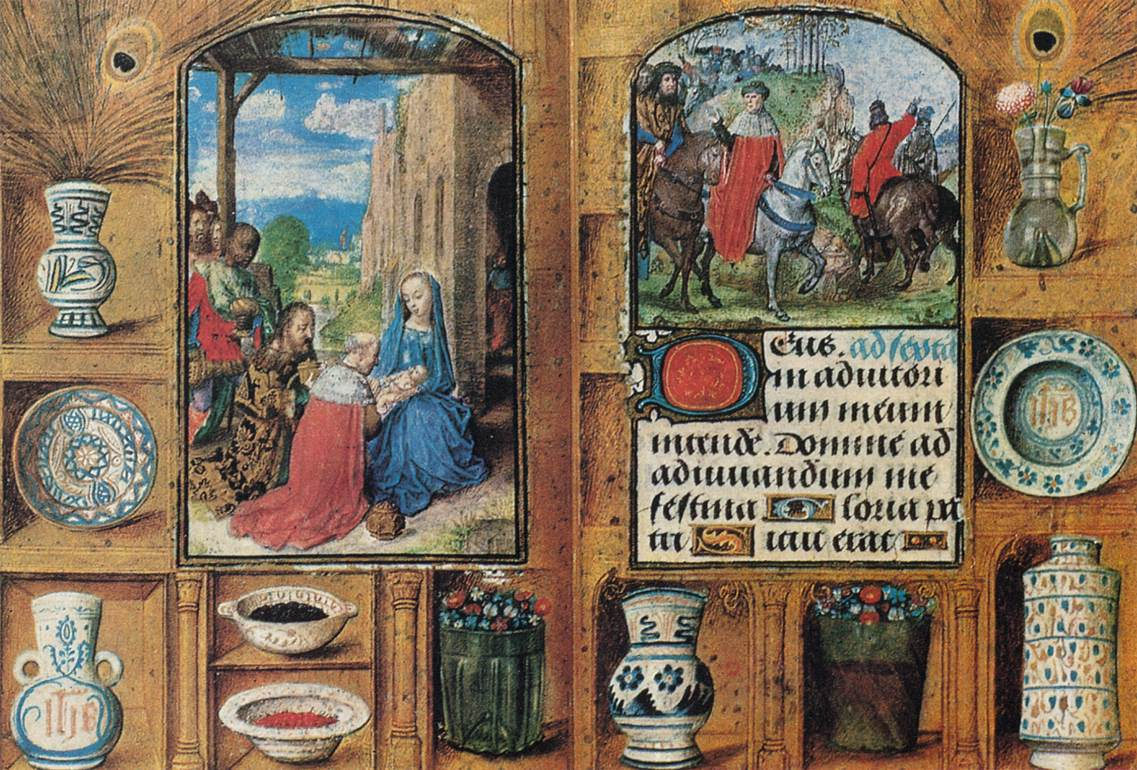
Various vessels in the border of an illuminated book of hours for Engelbert of Nassau, Flemish artist, 1470s

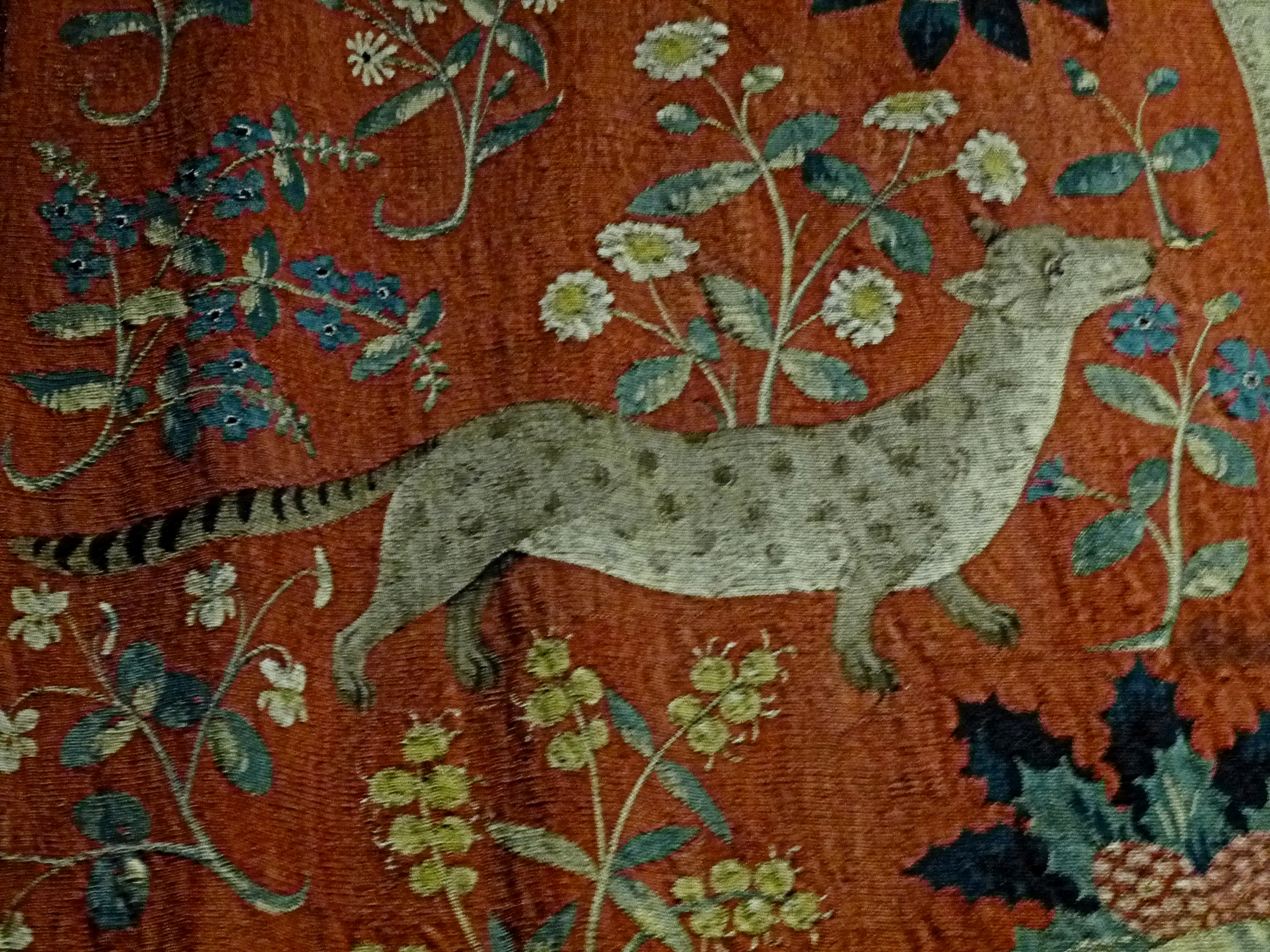
Detail of one of The Lady and the Unicorn millefleur tapestries, c. 1500

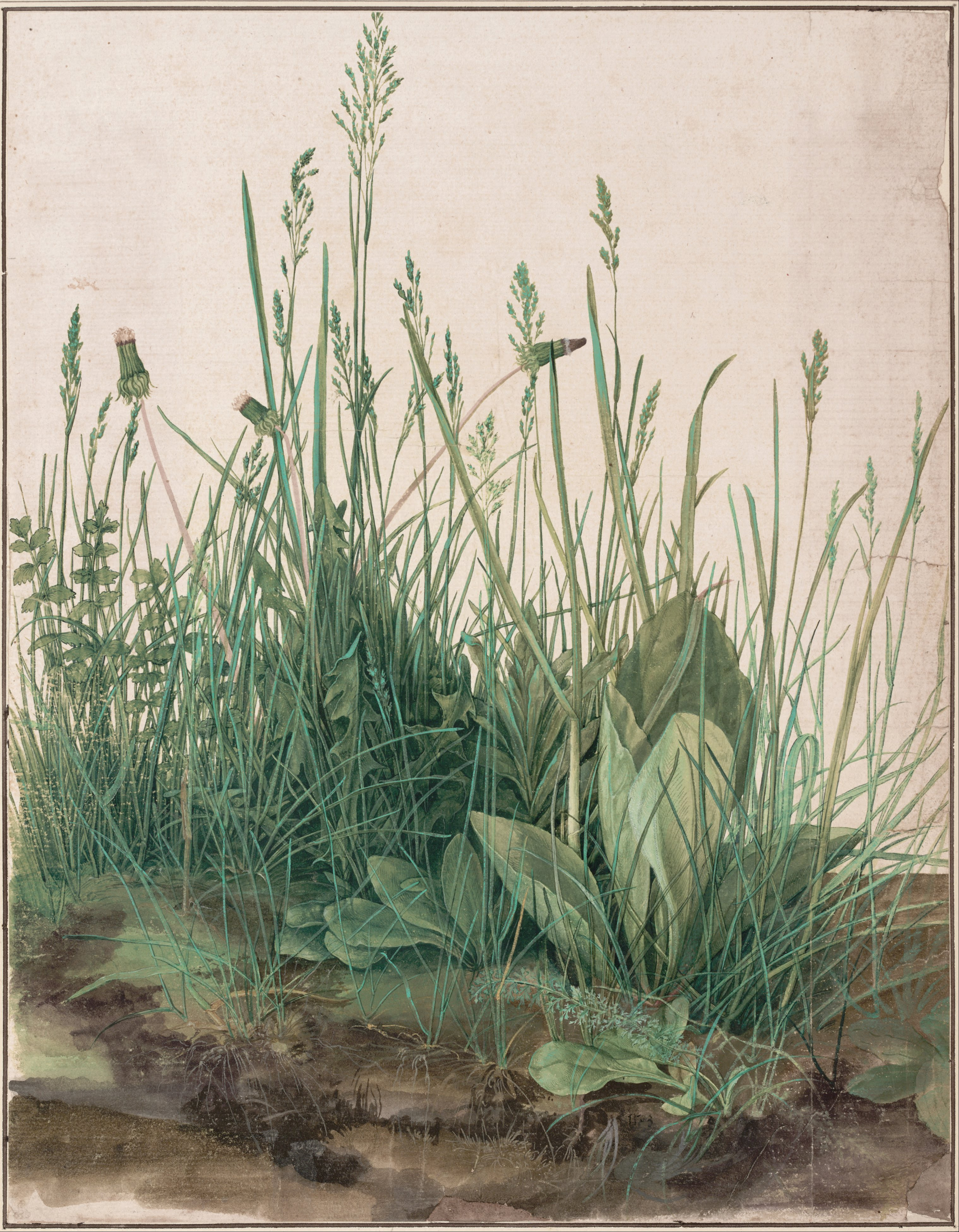
Albrecht Dürer, Great Piece of Turf, 1503

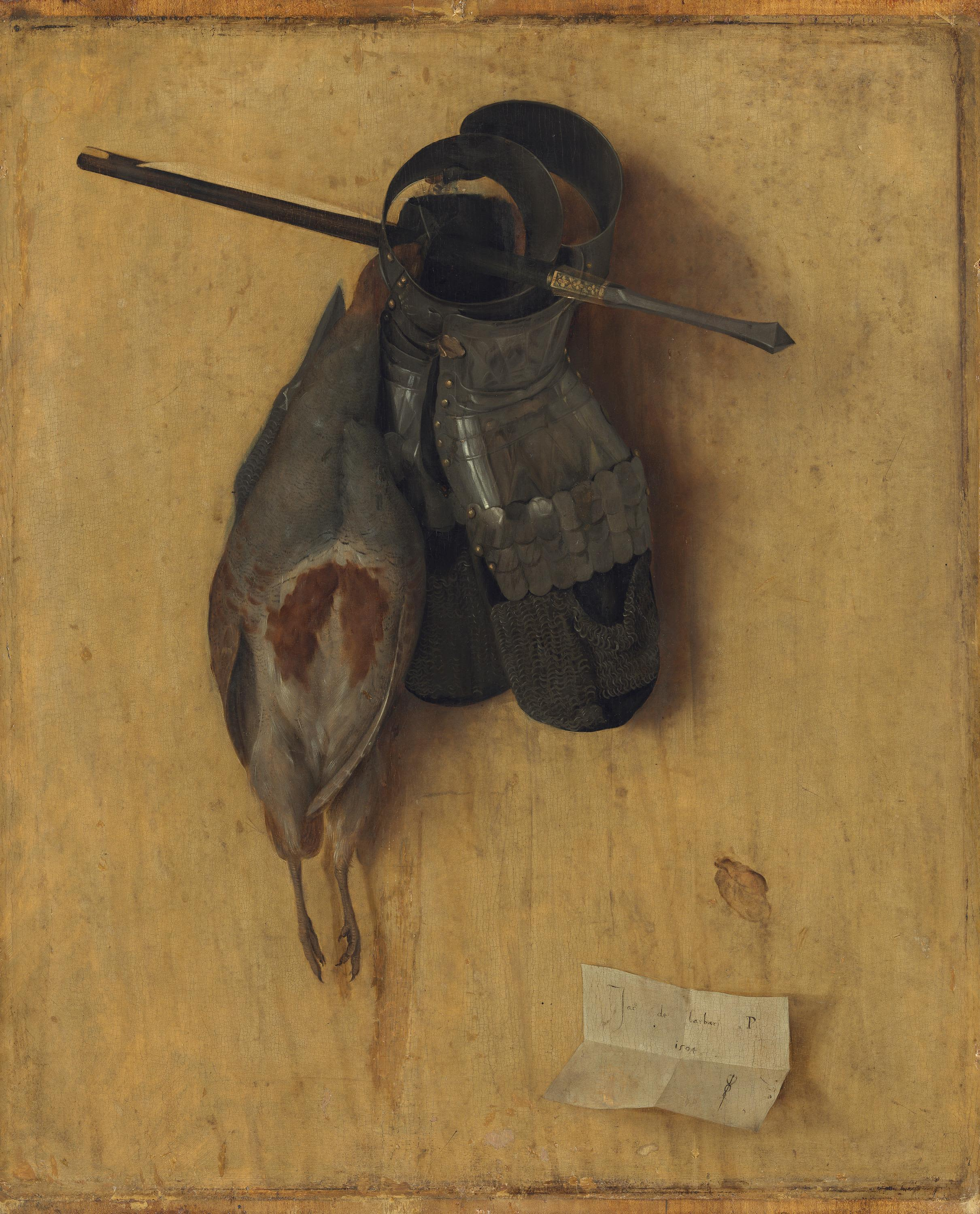
Jacopo de' Barbari, Still-Life with Partridge and Gauntlets (1504), a very early independent still life, perhaps the back or cover for a portrait

== Later Renaissance ==
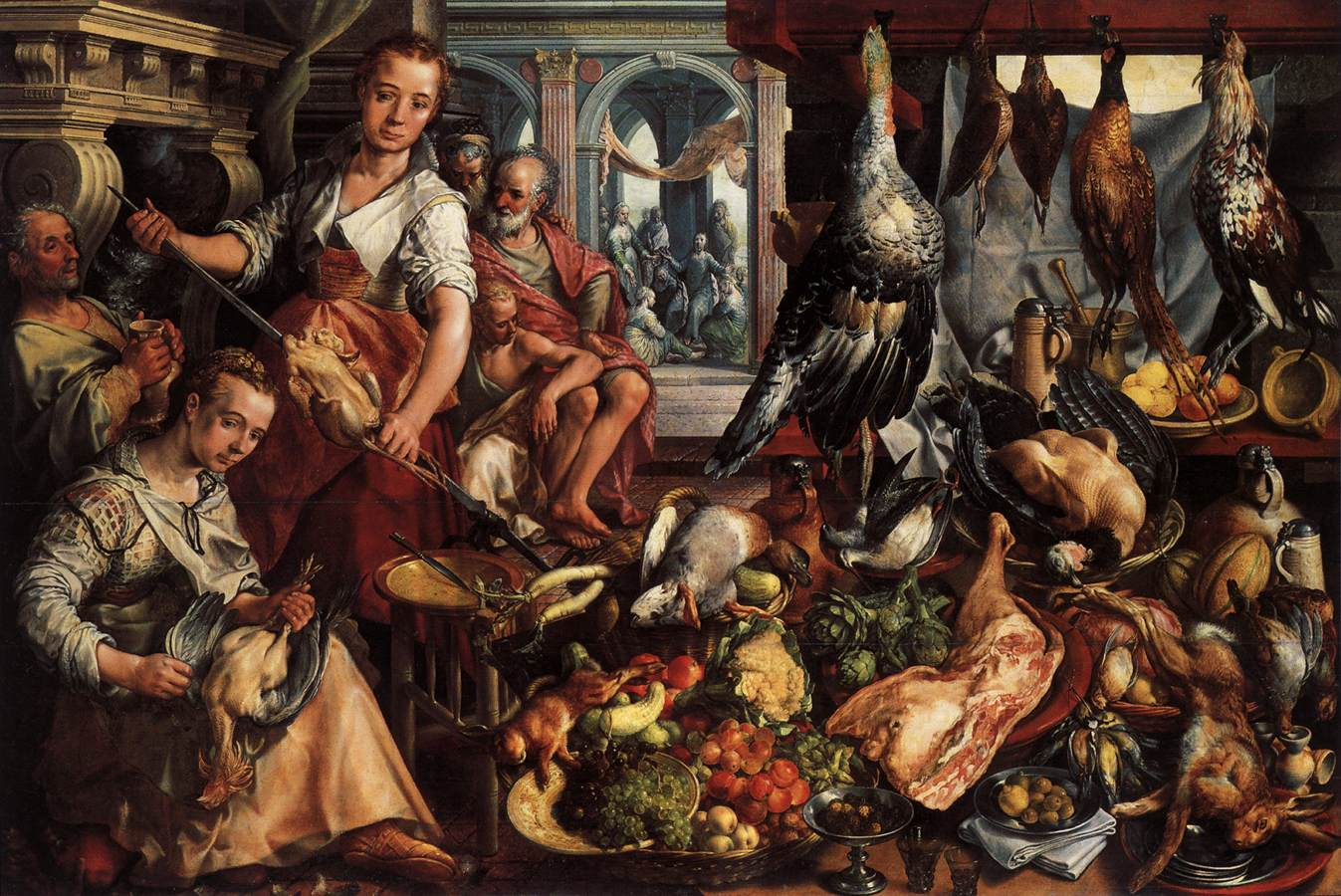
Joachim Beuckelaer (1533–1575), Kitchen scene, with Jesus in the house of Martha and Mary in the background (1566), 171 × 250 cm (67.3 × 98.4 in).

=== Sixteenth century ===
Though most still lifes after 1600 were relatively small paintings, a crucial stage in the development of the genre was the tradition, mostly centred on Antwerp, of the "monumental still life", which were large paintings that included great spreads of still-life material with figures and often animals. This was a development by Pieter Aertsen, whose A Meat Stall with the Holy Family Giving Alms (1551, now Uppsala) introduced the type with a painting that still startles. Another example is "The Butcher Shop" by Aertsen's nephew Joachim Beuckelaer (1568), with its realistic depiction of raw meats dominating the foreground, while a background scene conveys the dangers of drunkenness and lechery. The type of very large kitchen or market scene developed by Pieter Aertsen and his nephew Joachim Beuckelaer typically depicts an abundance of food with a kitchenware still life and burly Flemish kitchen-maids. A small religious scene can often be made out in the distance, or a theme such as the Four Seasons is added to elevate the subject. This sort of large-scale still life continued to develop in Flemish painting after the separation of the North and South, but is rare in Dutch painting, although other works in this tradition anticipate the "merry company" type of genre painting.

Gradually, religious content diminished in size and placement in this type of painting, though moral lessons continued as sub-contexts. One of the relatively few Italian works in the style, Annibale Carracci's treatment of the same subject in 1583, Butcher's Shop, begins to remove the moral messages, as did other "kitchen and market" still-life paintings of this period. Vincenzo Campi probably introduced the Antwerp style to Italy in the 1570s. The tradition continued into the next century, with several works by Rubens, who mostly sub-contracted the still-life and animal elements to specialist masters such as Frans Snyders and his pupil Jan Fyt. By the second half of the 16th century, the autonomous still life evolved.

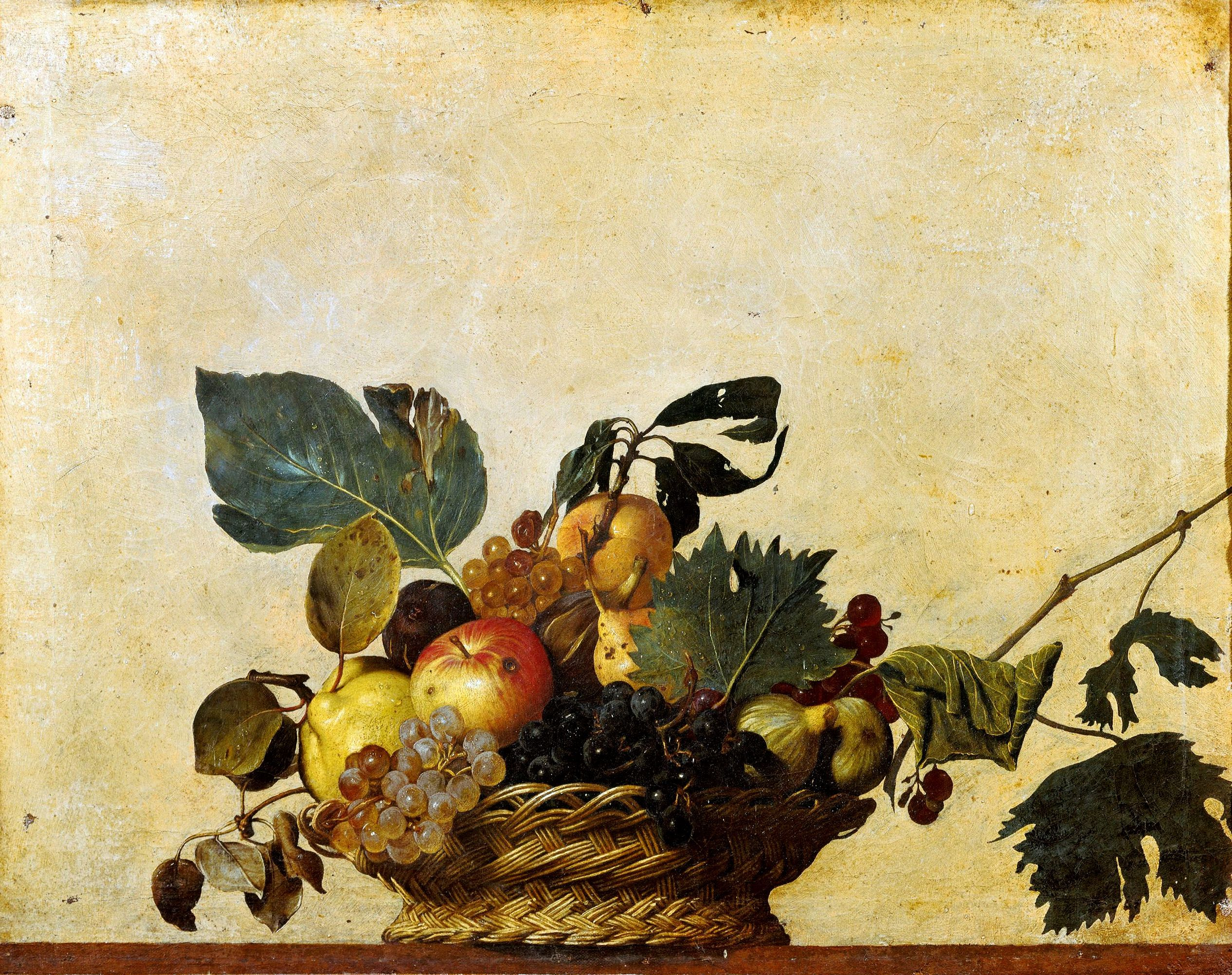
Michelangelo Merisi da Caravaggio, Fruitbasket (1595–96), oil on canvas, 31 × 47 cm

The 16th century witnessed an explosion of interest in the natural world and the creation of lavish botanical encyclopædias recording the discoveries of the New World and Asia. It also prompted the beginning of scientific illustration and the classification of specimens. Natural objects began to be appreciated as individual objects of study apart from any religious or mythological associations. The early science of herbal remedies began at this time as well, which was a practical extension of this new knowledge. In addition, wealthy patrons began to underwrite the collection of animal and mineral specimens, creating extensive cabinets of curiosities. These specimens served as models for painters who sought realism and novelty. Shells, insects, exotic fruits and flowers began to be collected and traded, and new plants such as the tulip (imported to Europe from Turkey), were celebrated in still-life paintings.

The horticultural explosion was of widespread interest in Europe and artist capitalized on that to produce thousands of still-life paintings. Some regions and courts had particular interests. The depiction of citrus, for example, was a particular passion of the Medici court in Florence, Italy. This great diffusion of natural specimens and the burgeoning interest in natural illustration throughout Europe, resulted in the nearly simultaneous creation of modern still-life paintings around 1600.

At the turn of the century the Spanish painter Juan Sánchez Cotán pioneered the Spanish still life with austerely tranquil paintings of vegetables, before entering a monastery in his forties in 1603, after which he painted religious subjects.

=== Sixteenth-century paintings ===
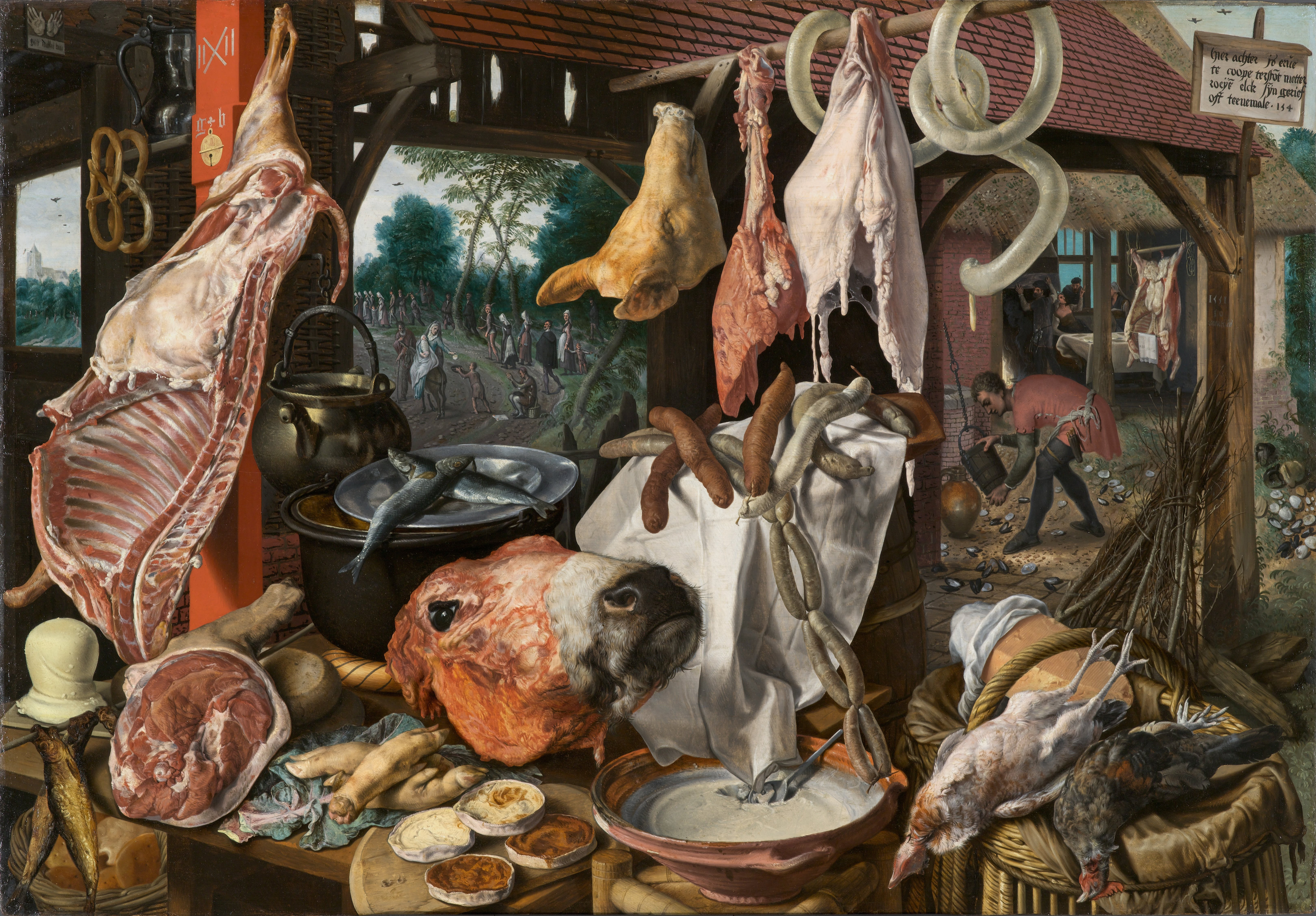
Pieter Aertsen, A Meat Stall with the Holy Family Giving Alms (1551), 123.3 × 150 cm (48.5 × 59")

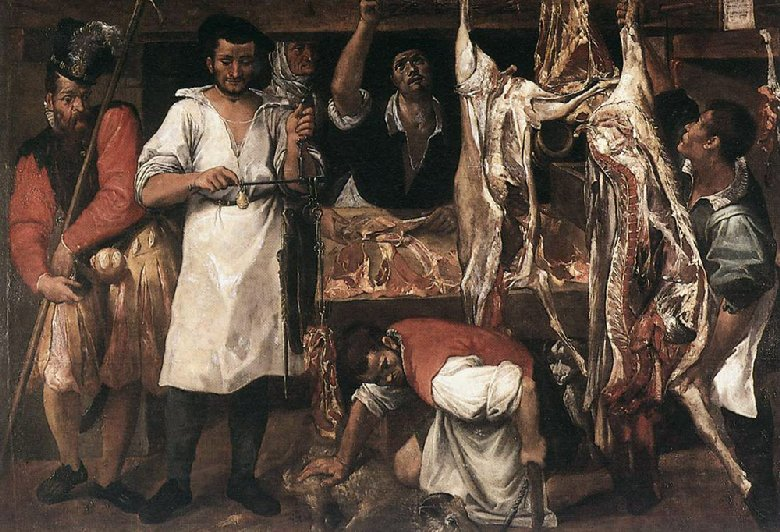
Annibale Carracci (1560–1609), Butcher's Shop (1580)

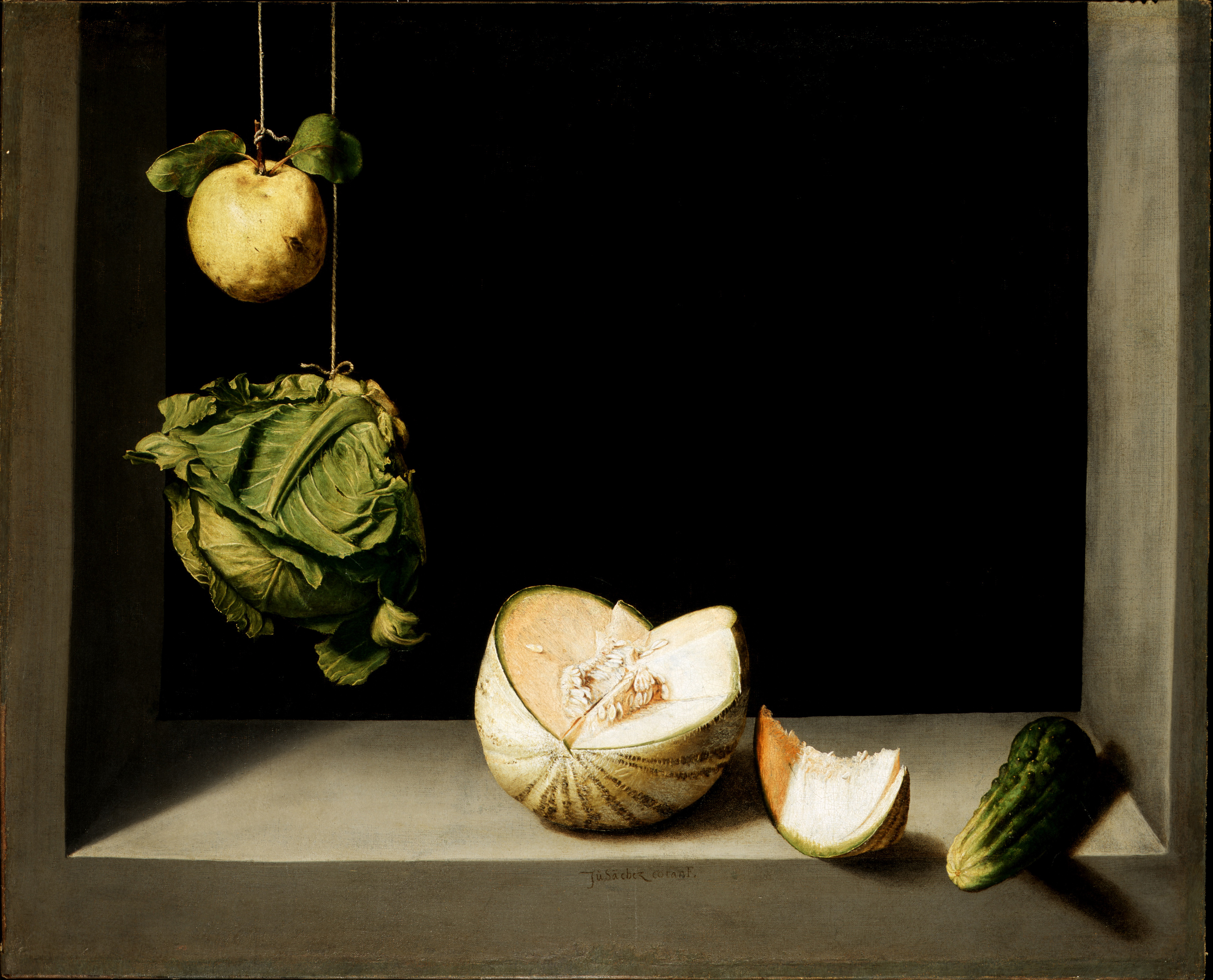
Juan Sánchez Cotán (1560–1627), Still life with Quince, Cabbage, Melon and Cucumber, oil on canvas, 69 × 84.5 cm

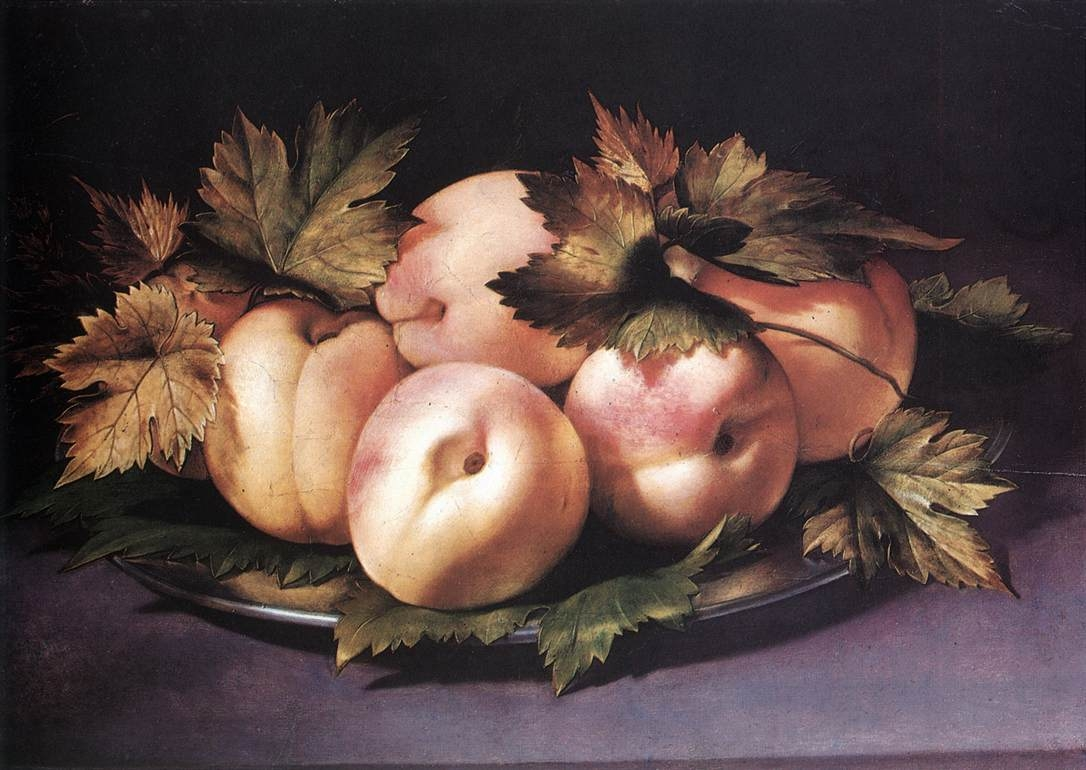
Giovanni Ambrogio Figino, Metal Plate with Peaches and Vine Leaves (1591–94), panel, 21 × 30 cm, his only known still life

== Seventeenth century ==
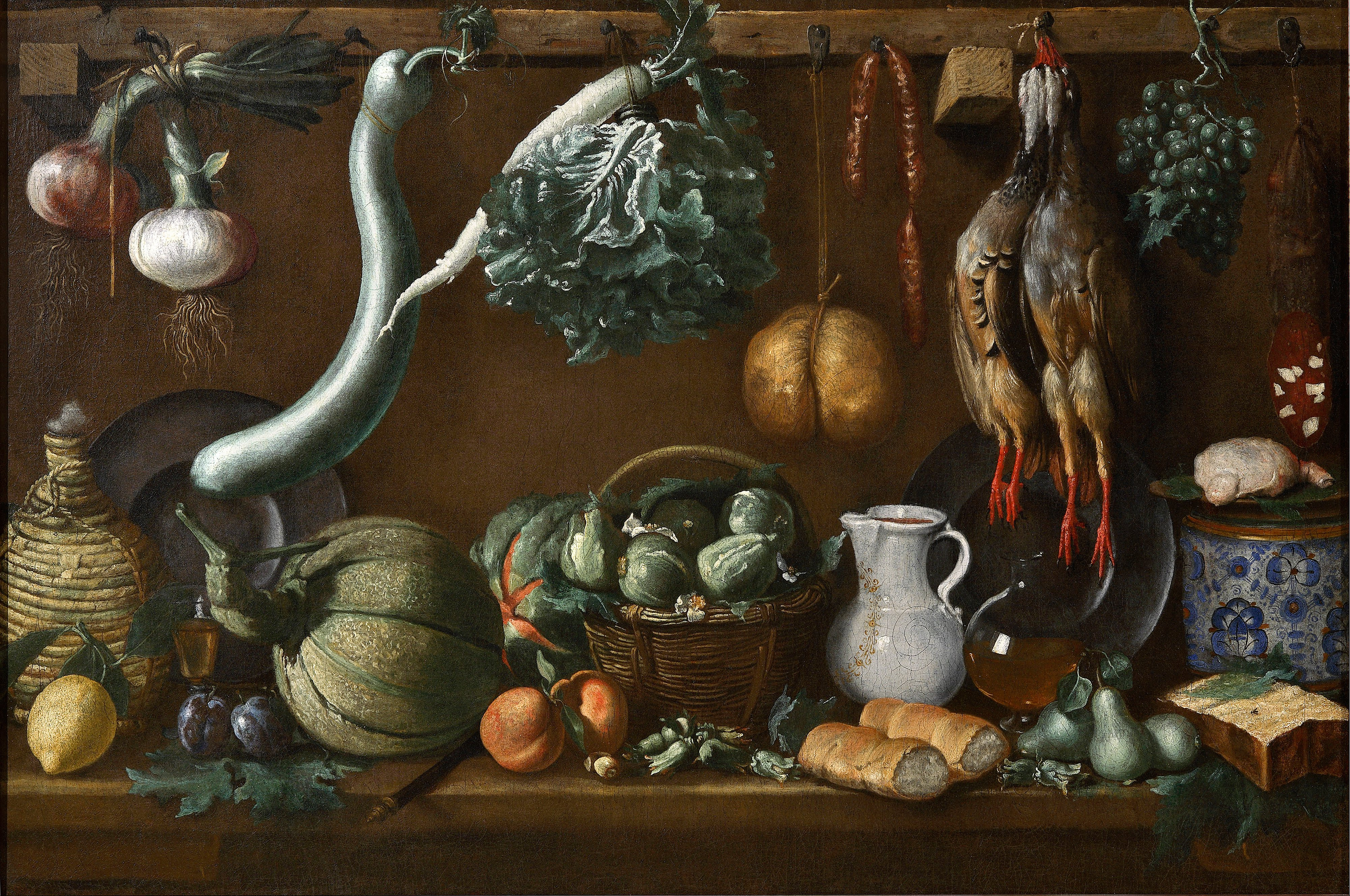
Jacopo da Empoli (Jacopo Chimenti), Still life (c. 1625)

Prominent Academicians of the early 17th century, such as Andrea Sacchi, felt that genre and still-life painting did not carry the "gravitas" merited for painting to be considered great. An influential formulation of 1667 by André Félibien, a historiographer, architect and theoretician of French classicism became the classic statement of the theory of the hierarchy of genres for the 18th century:

Celui qui fait parfaitement des païsages est au-dessus d'un autre qui ne fait que des fruits, des fleurs ou des coquilles. Celui qui peint des animaux vivants est plus estimable que ceux qui ne représentent que des choses mortes & sans mouvement; & comme la figure de l'homme est le plus parfait ouvrage de Dieu sur la Terre, il est certain aussi que celui qui se rend l'imitateur de Dieu en peignant des figures humaines, est beaucoup plus excellent que tous les autres ...

He who produces perfect landscapes is above another who only produces fruit, flowers or seafood. He who paints living animals is more estimable than those who only represent dead things without movement, and as man is the most perfect work of God on the earth, it is also certain that he who becomes an imitator of God in representing human figures, is much more excellent than all the others ...".

=== Dutch and Flemish painting ===
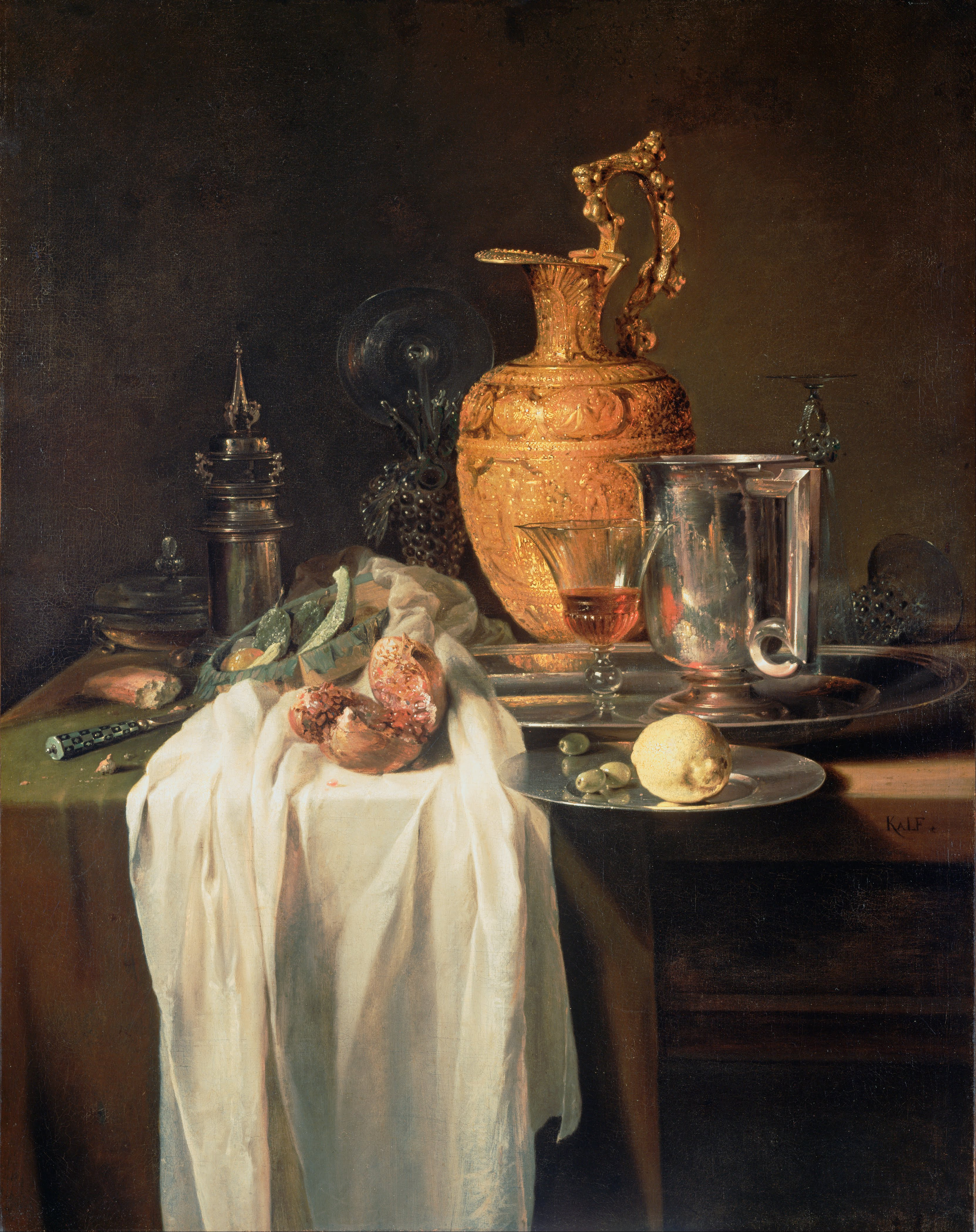
Willem Kalf (1619–1693), oil on canvas, The J. Paul Getty Museum

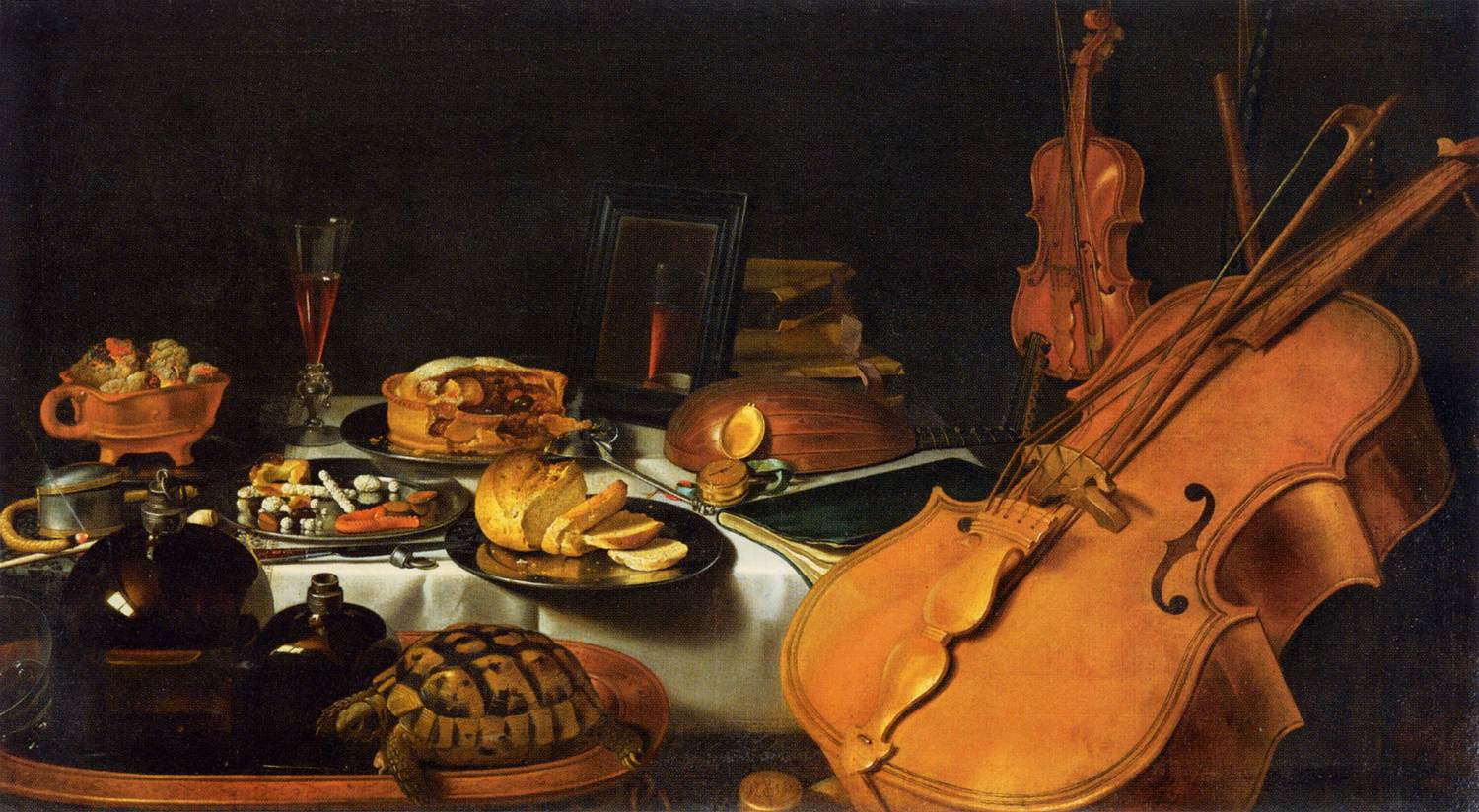
Pieter Claesz (1597–1660), Still life with Musical Instruments (1623)

Still life developed as a separate category in the Low Countries in the last quarter of the 16th century. The English term still life derives from the Dutch word stilleven while Romance languages (as well as Greek, Polish, Russian and Turkish) tend to use terms meaning dead nature. 15th-century Early Netherlandish painting had developed highly illusionistic techniques in both panel painting and illuminated manuscripts, where the borders often featured elaborate displays of flowers, insects and, in a work like the Hours of Catherine of Cleves, a great variety of objects. When the illuminated manuscript was displaced by the printed book, the same skills were later deployed in scientific botanical illustration; the Low Countries led Europe in both botany and its depiction in art. The Flemish artist Joris Hoefnagel (1542–1601) made watercolour and gouache paintings of flowers and other still-life subjects for the Emperor Rudolf II, and there were many engraved illustrations for books (often then hand-coloured), such as Hans Collaert's Florilegium, published by Plantin in 1600.

Around 1600 flower paintings in oils became something of a craze; Karel van Mander painted some works himself, and records that other Northern Mannerist artists such as Cornelis van Haarlem also did so. No surviving flower-pieces by them are known, but many survive by the leading specialists, Jan Brueghel the Elder and Ambrosius Bosschaert, both active in the Southern Netherlands.

While artists in the North found limited opportunity to produce the religious iconography which had long been their staple—images of religious subjects were forbidden in the Dutch Reformed Protestant Church—the continuing Northern tradition of detailed realism and hidden symbols appealed to the growing Dutch middle classes, who were replacing Church and State as the principal patrons of art in the Netherlands. Added to this was the Dutch mania for horticulture, particularly the tulip. These two views of flowers—as aesthetic objects and as religious symbols— merged to create a very strong market for this type of still life. Still life, like most Dutch art work, was generally sold in open markets or by dealers, or by artists at their studios, and rarely commissioned; therefore, artists usually chose the subject matter and arrangement. So popular was this type of still-life painting, that much of the technique of Dutch flower painting was codified in the 1740 treatise Groot Schilderboeck by Gerard de Lairesse, which gave wide-ranging advice on colour, arranging, brushwork, preparation of specimens, harmony, composition, perspective, etc.

The symbolism of flowers had evolved since early Christian days. The most common flowers and their symbolic meanings include: rose (Virgin Mary, transience, Venus, love); lily (Virgin Mary, virginity, female breast, purity of mind or justice); tulip (showiness, nobility); sunflower (faithfulness, divine love, devotion); violet (modesty, reserve, humility); columbine (melancholy); poppy (power, sleep, death). As for insects, the butterfly represents transformation and resurrection while the dragonfly symbolizes transience and the ant hard work and attention to the harvest.

Flemish and Dutch artists also branched out and revived the ancient Greek still life tradition of trompe-l'œil, particularly the imitation of nature or mimesis, which they termed bedriegertje ("little deception"). In addition to these types of still life, Dutch artists identified and separately developed "kitchen and market" paintings, breakfast and food table still life, vanitas paintings, and allegorical collection paintings.

In the Catholic Southern Netherlands the genre of garland paintings was developed. Around 1607–1608, Antwerp artists Jan Brueghel the Elder and Hendrick van Balen started creating these pictures which consist of an image (usually devotional) which is encircled by a lush still life wreath. The paintings were collaborations between two specialists: a still life and a figure painter. Daniel Seghers developed the genre further. Originally serving a devotional function, garland paintings became extremely popular and were widely used as decoration of homes.

A special genre of still life was the so-called pronkstilleven (Dutch for 'ostentatious still life'). This style of ornate still-life painting was developed in the 1640s in Antwerp by Flemish artists such as Frans Snyders and Adriaen van Utrecht. They painted still lifes that emphasized abundance by depicting a diversity of objects, fruits, flowers and dead game, often together with living people and animals. The style was soon adopted by artists from the Dutch Republic.

Especially popular in this period were vanitas paintings, in which sumptuous arrangements of fruit and flowers, books, statuettes, vases, coins, jewelry, paintings, musical and scientific instruments, military insignia, fine silver and crystal, were accompanied by symbolic reminders of life's impermanence. Additionally, a skull, an hourglass or pocket watch, a candle burning down or a book with pages turning, would serve as a moralizing message on the ephemerality of sensory pleasures. Often some of the fruits and flowers themselves would be shown starting to spoil or fade to emphasize the same point.

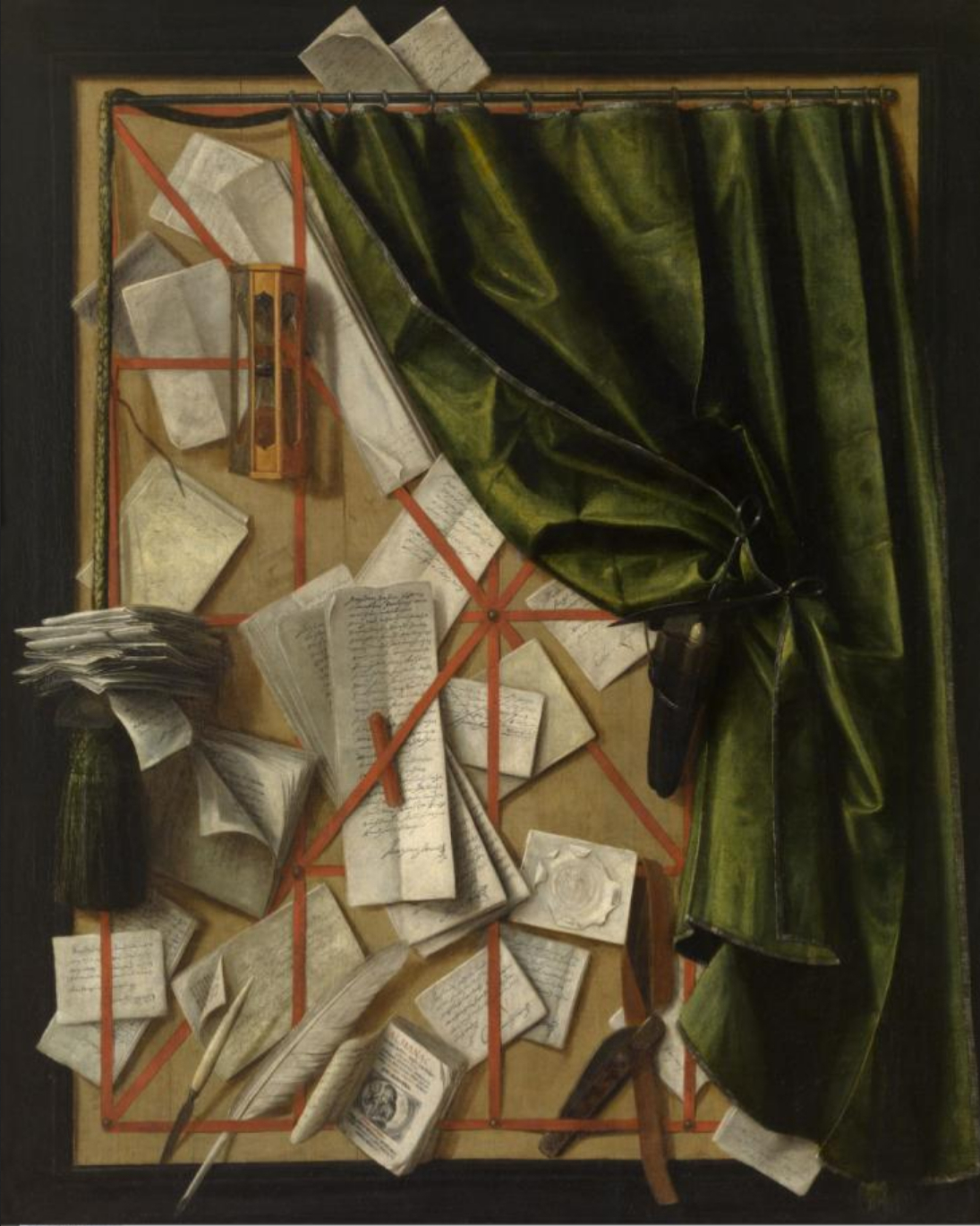
Cornelis Norbertus Gysbrechts (c. 1660–1683), Trompe-l'œil (c. 1680), Los Angeles County Museum of Art

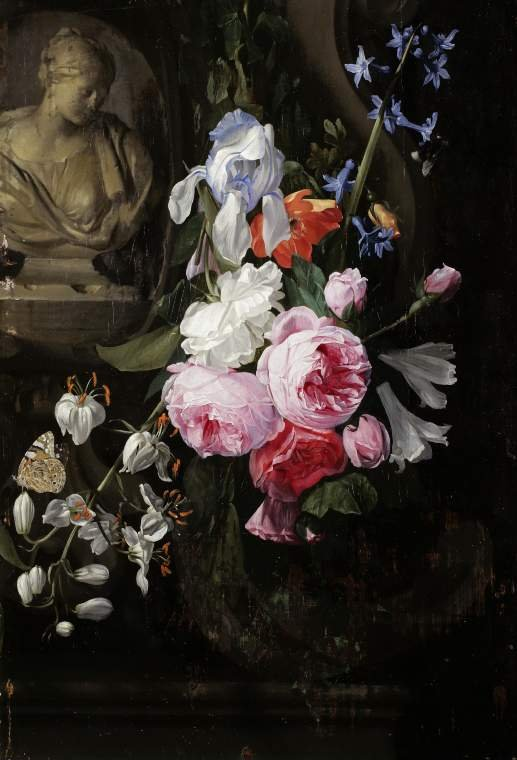
Jan Philip van Thielen (1618–1667), Vase of Flowers (c. 1660), Fitzwilliam Museum, Cambridge, England

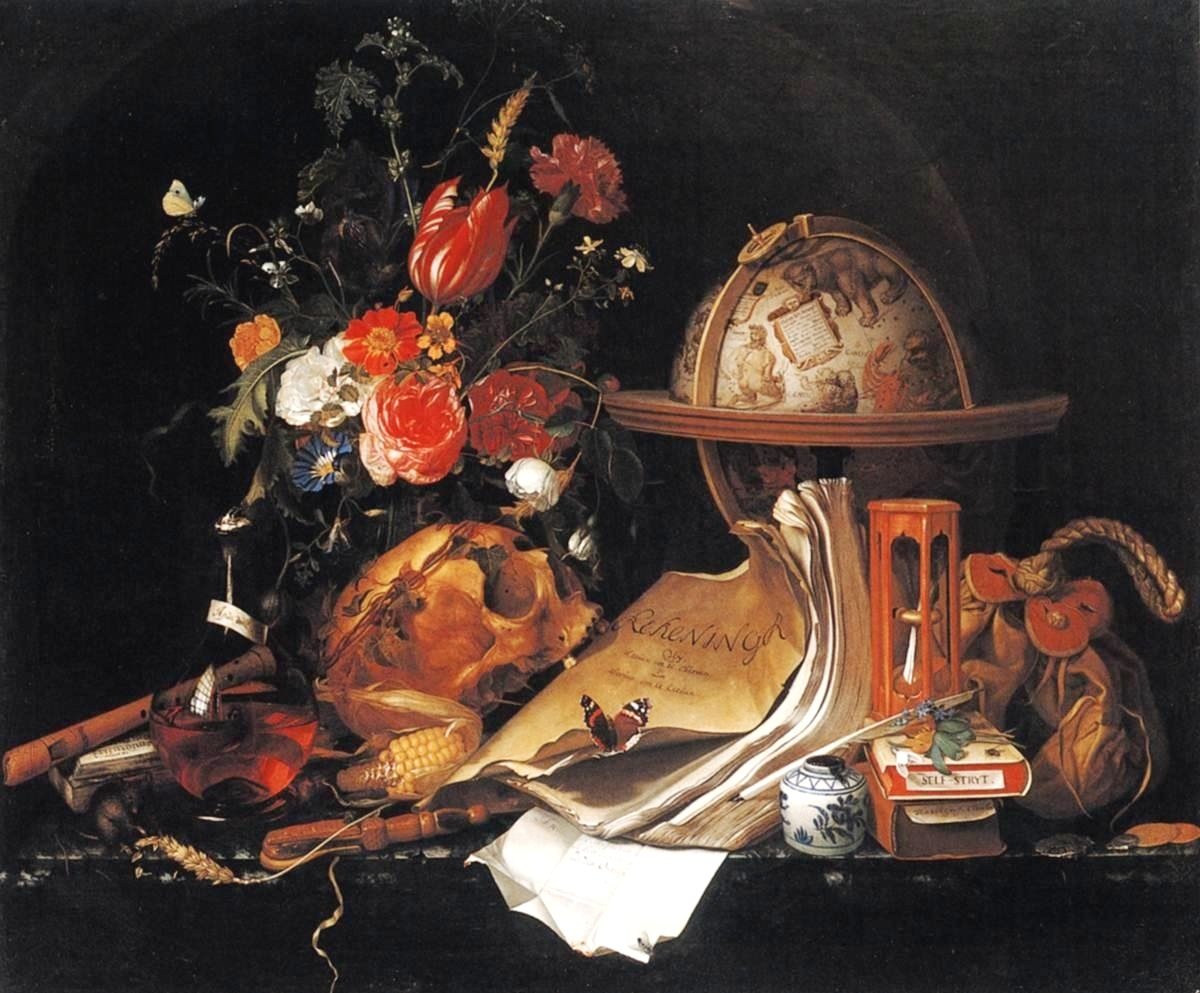
Maria van Oosterwijk, Vanitas-Still Life (1693)

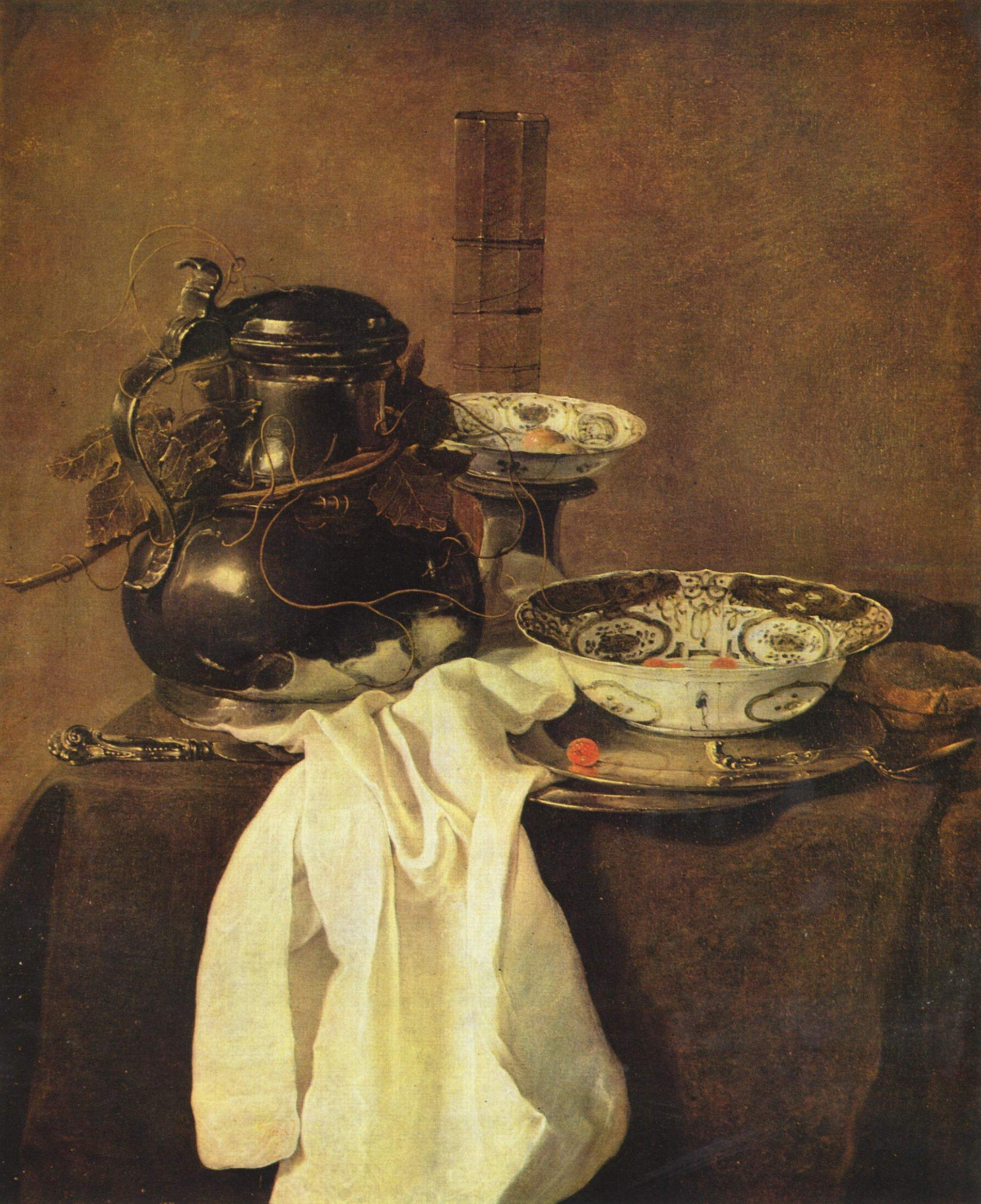
Jan Jansz. Treck (1606–1652), Still Life Pewter Jug and Two Porcelain Plates (1645)

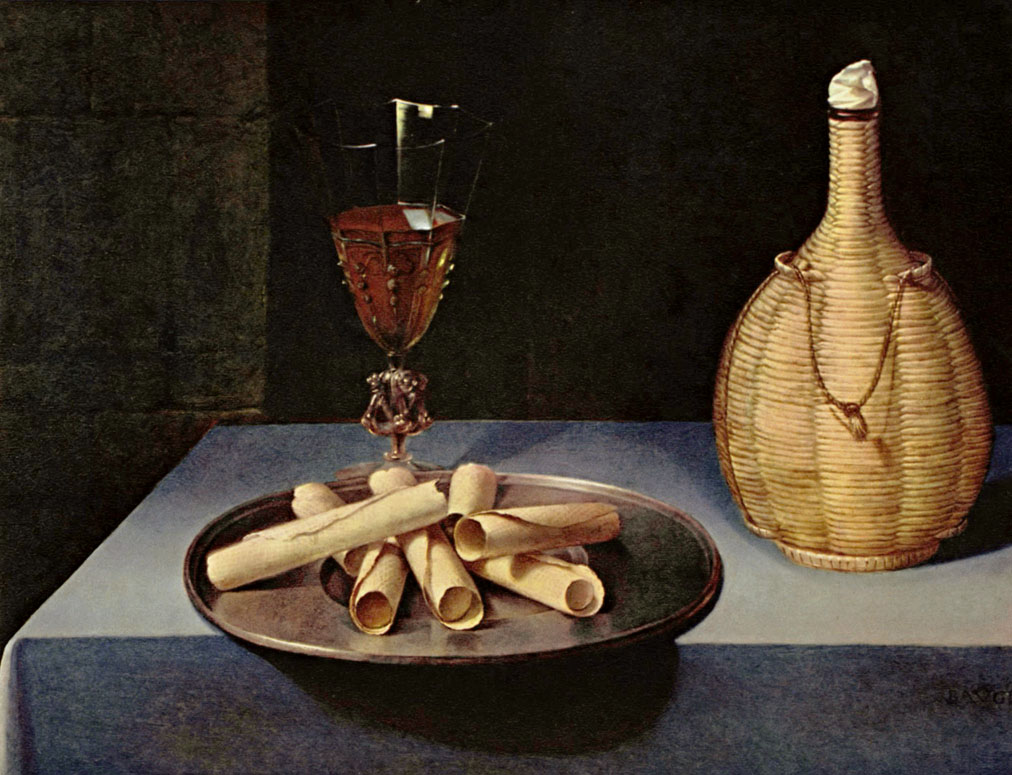
Lubin Baugin (c. 1610–1663), Le Dessert de gaufrettes (c. 1631), Musée du Louvre, Paris

Another type of still life, known as ontbijtjes or "breakfast paintings", represent both a literal presentation of delicacies that the upper class might enjoy and a religious reminder to avoid gluttony. Around 1650 Samuel van Hoogstraten painted one of the first wall-rack pictures, trompe-l'œil still-life paintings which feature objects tied, tacked or attached in some other fashion to a wall board, a type of still life very popular in the United States in the 19th century. Another variation was the trompe-l'œil still life depicted objects associated with a given profession, as with the Cornelis Norbertus Gysbrecht's painting "Painter's Easel with Fruit Piece", which displays all the tools of a painter's craft. Also popular in the first half of the 17th century was the painting of a large assortment of specimens in allegorical form, such as the "five senses", "four continents", or "the four seasons", showing a goddess or allegorical figure surrounded by appropriate natural and human-made objects. The popularity of vanitas paintings, and these other forms of still life, soon spread from Holland to Flanders and Germany, and also to Spain and France.

The Netherlandish production of still lifes was enormous, and they were very widely exported, especially to northern Europe; Britain hardly produced any itself. German still life followed closely the Dutch models; Georg Flegel was a pioneer in pure still life without figures and created the compositional innovation of placing detailed objects in cabinets, cupboards, and display cases, and producing simultaneous multiple views.

==== Dutch, Flemish, German and French paintings ====
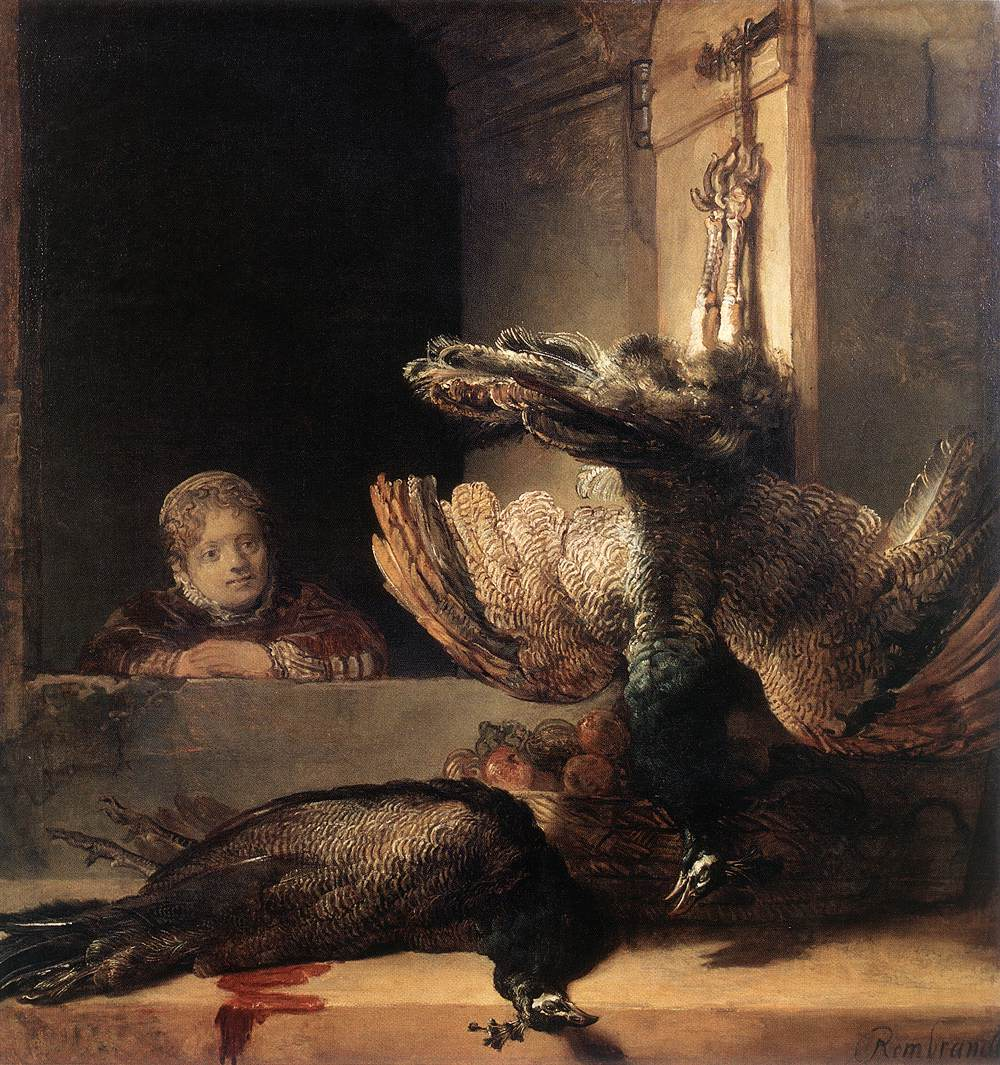
Rembrandt, Still-Life with Two Dead Peacocks and a Girl (c. 1639)

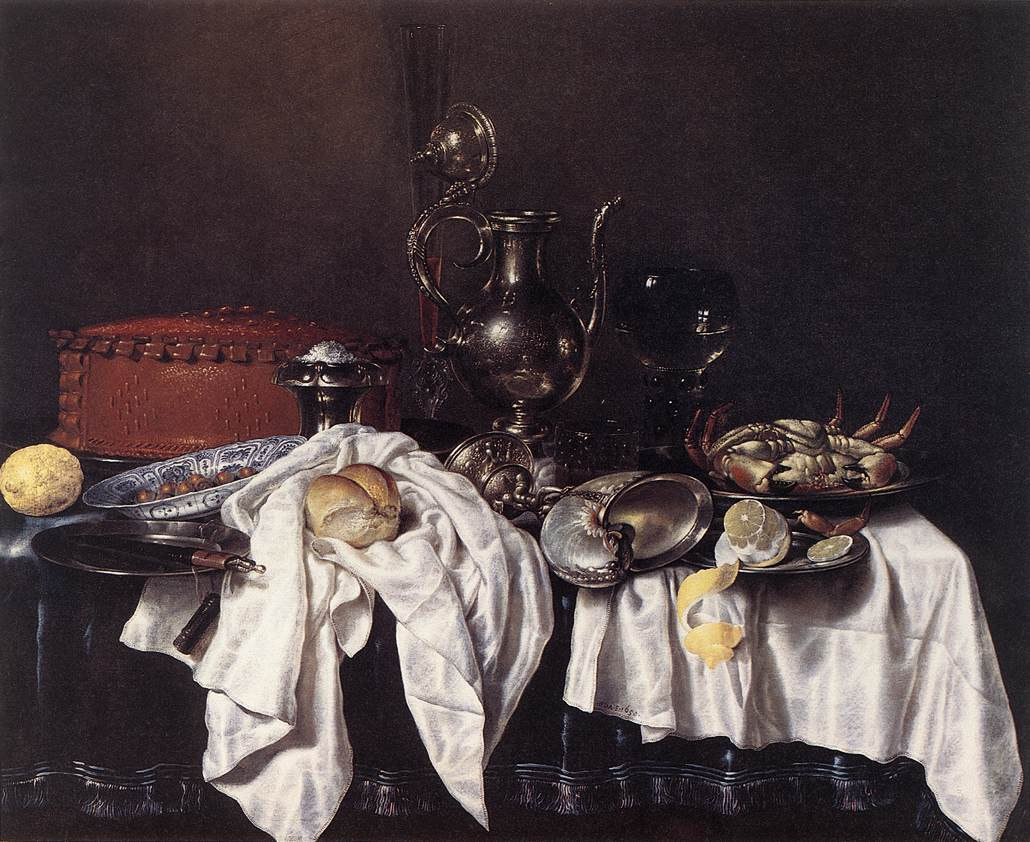
Willem Claeszoon Heda (1594–1680), Still Life with Pie, Silver Ewer and Crab (1658)

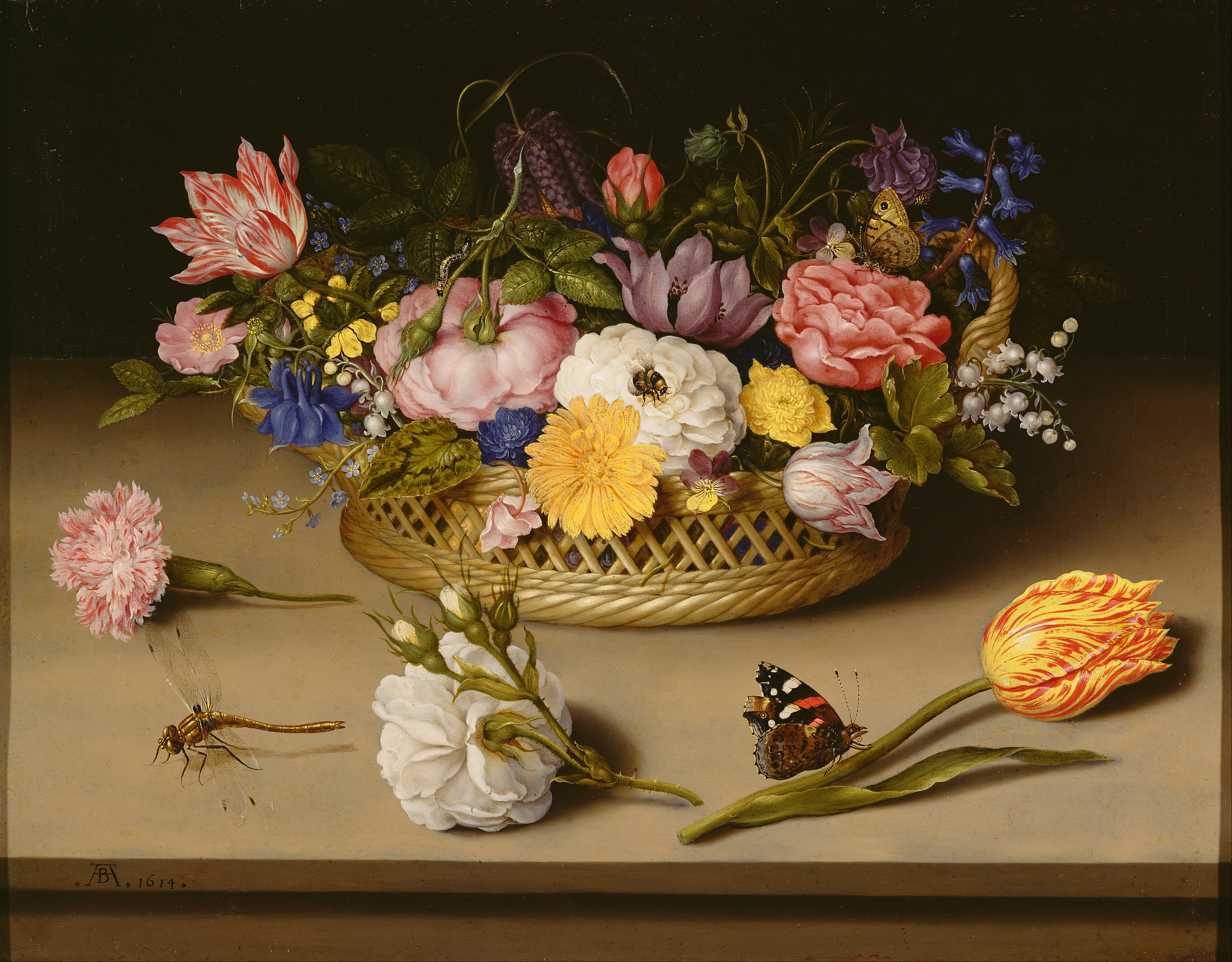
Ambrosius Bosschaert (1573–1621), Still-Life of Flowers (1614)

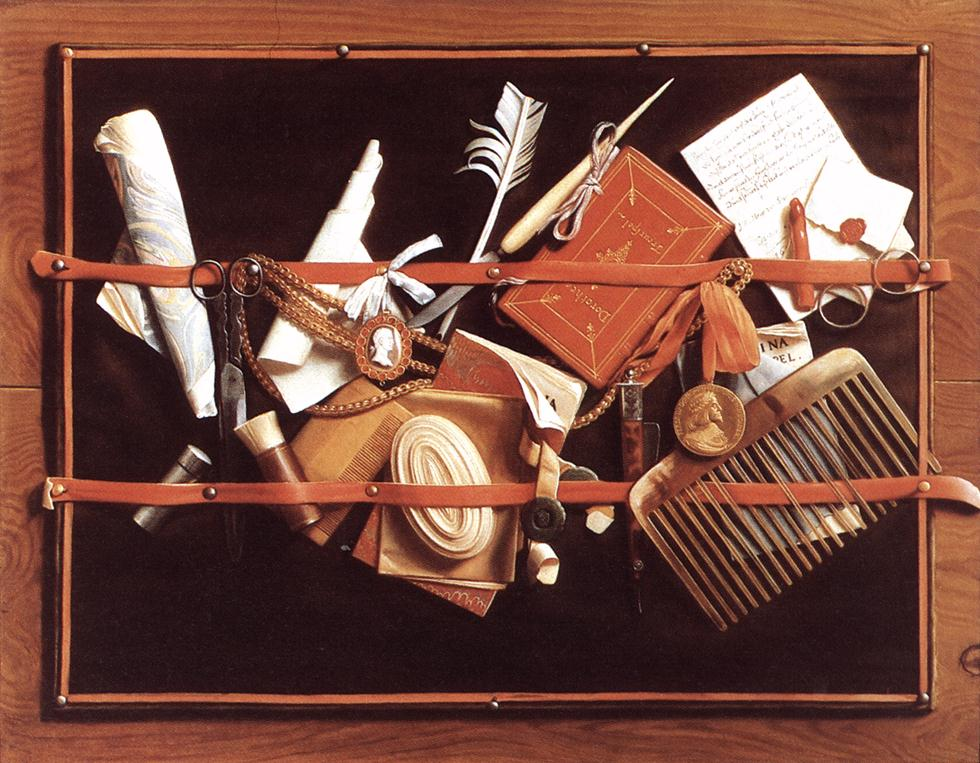
Samuel van Hoogstraten, Feigned Letter Rack with Writing Implements (c. 1655)

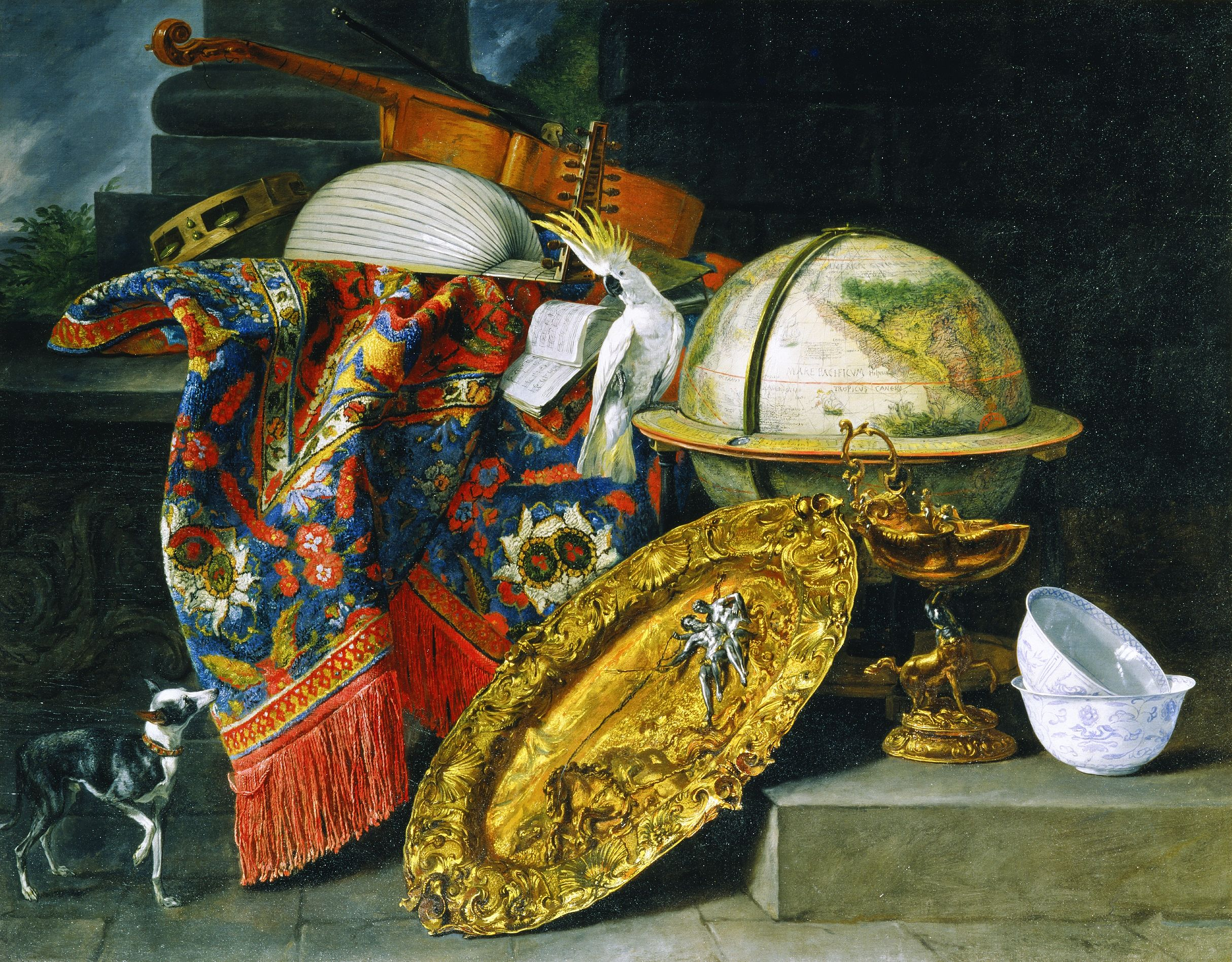
Pieter Boel (1626–1674), Still Life with a Globe and a Parrot (c. 1658)

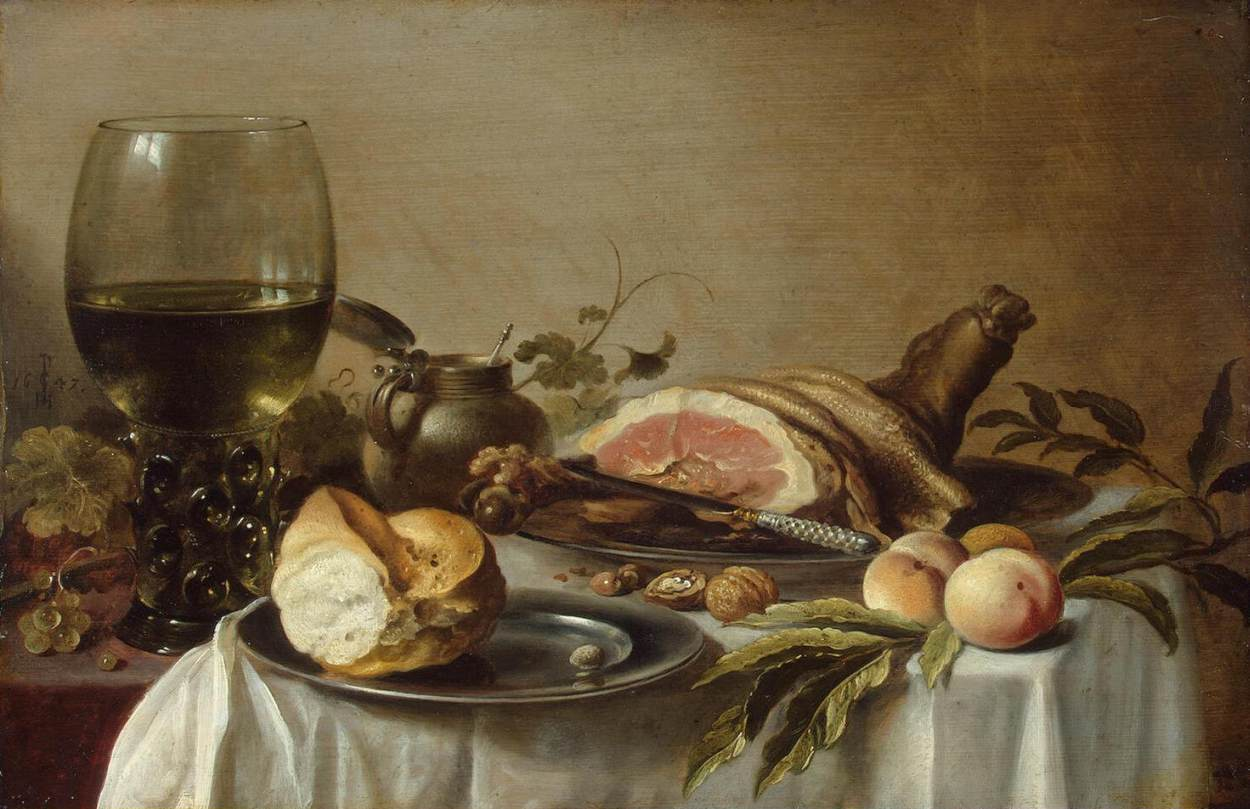
Pieter Claesz (c. 1597–1660), Still Life (1623)

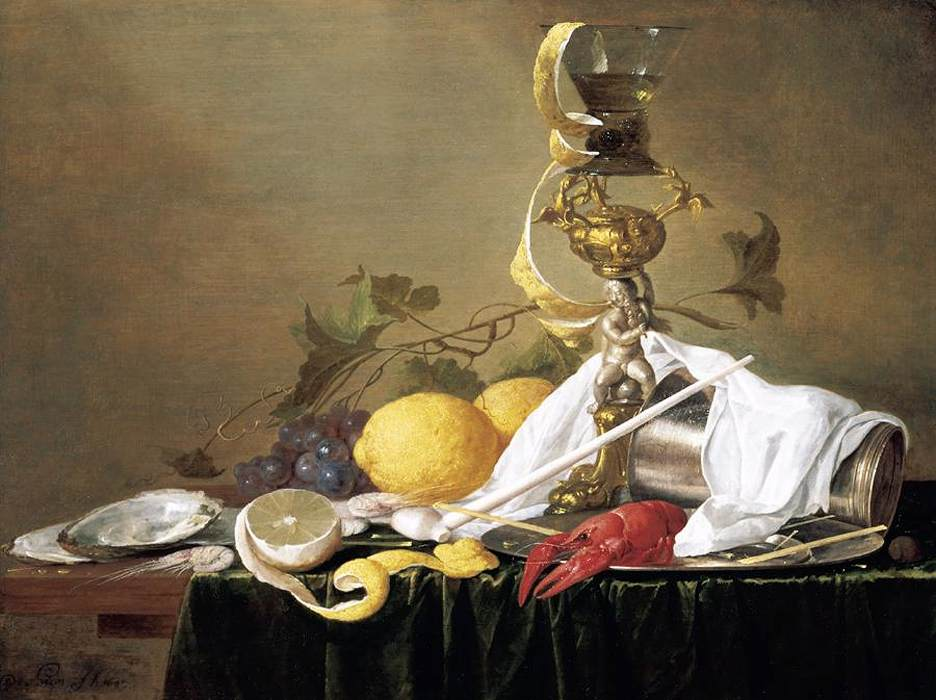
Jan Davidsz. de Heem (1606–1684), Still Life with Fruit, Flowers, Glasses and Lobster (c. 1660s)

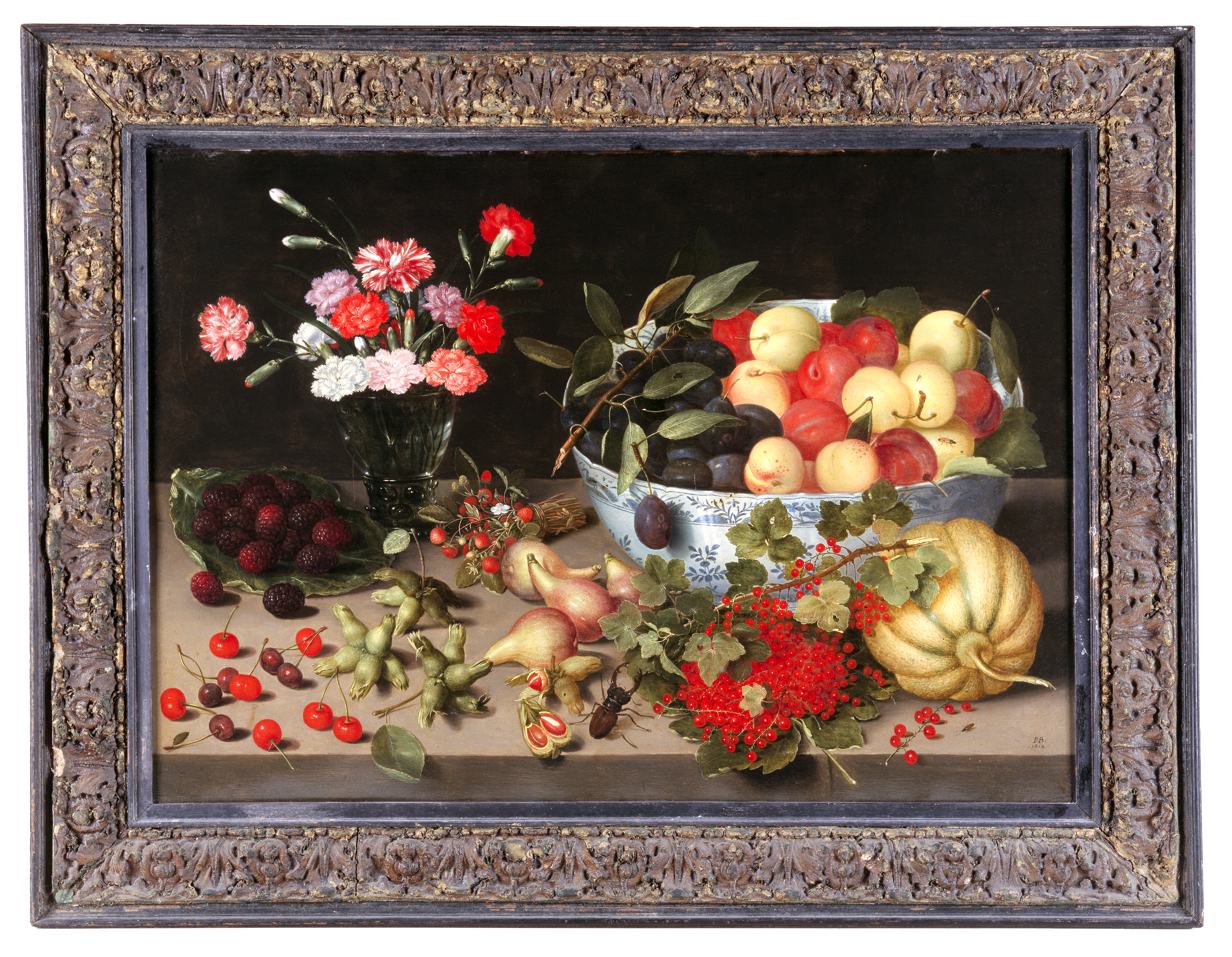
Peter Binoit, 1618, Skokloster Castle.

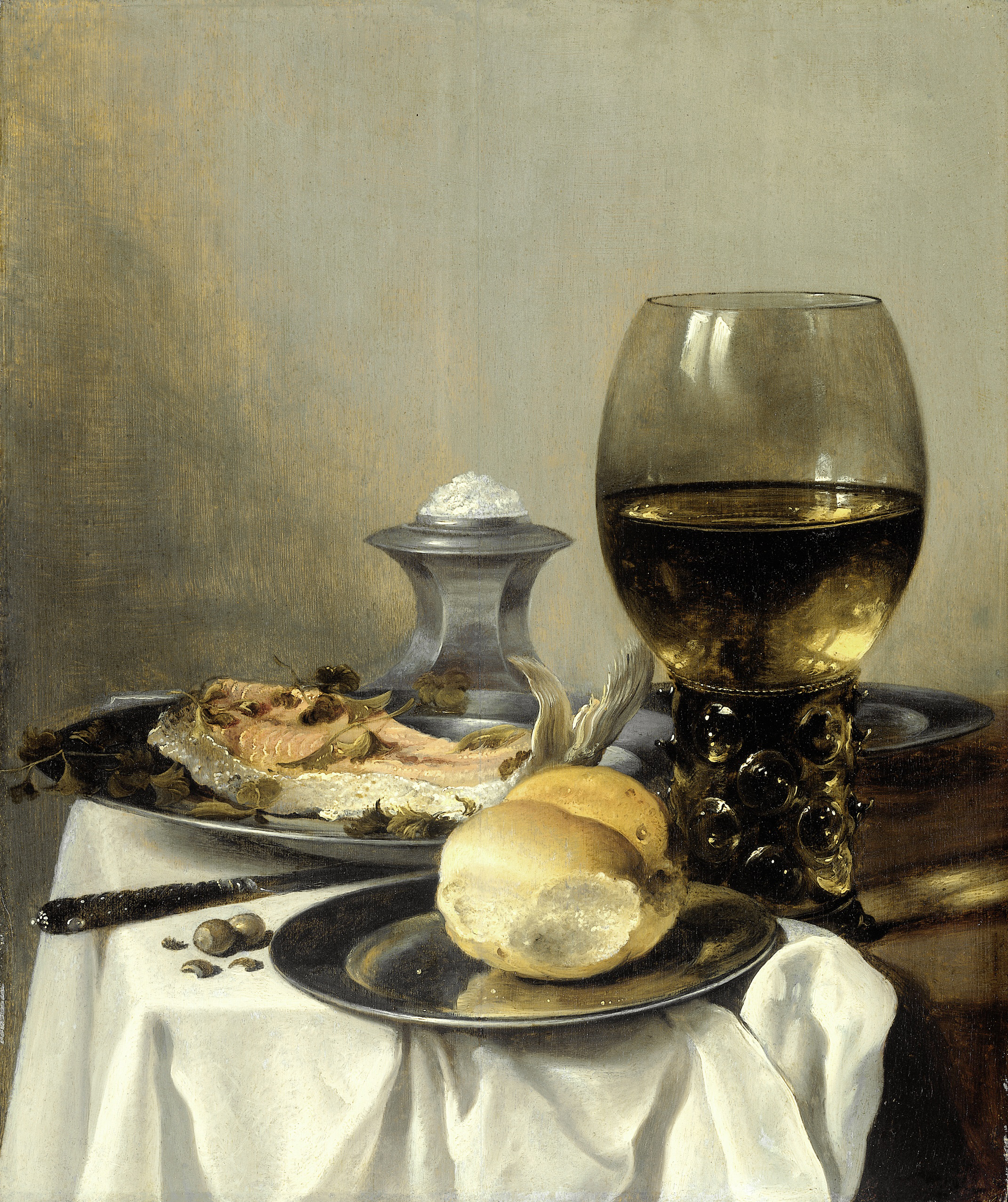
Pieter Claesz (c. 1597–1660), Still Life with Salt Tub

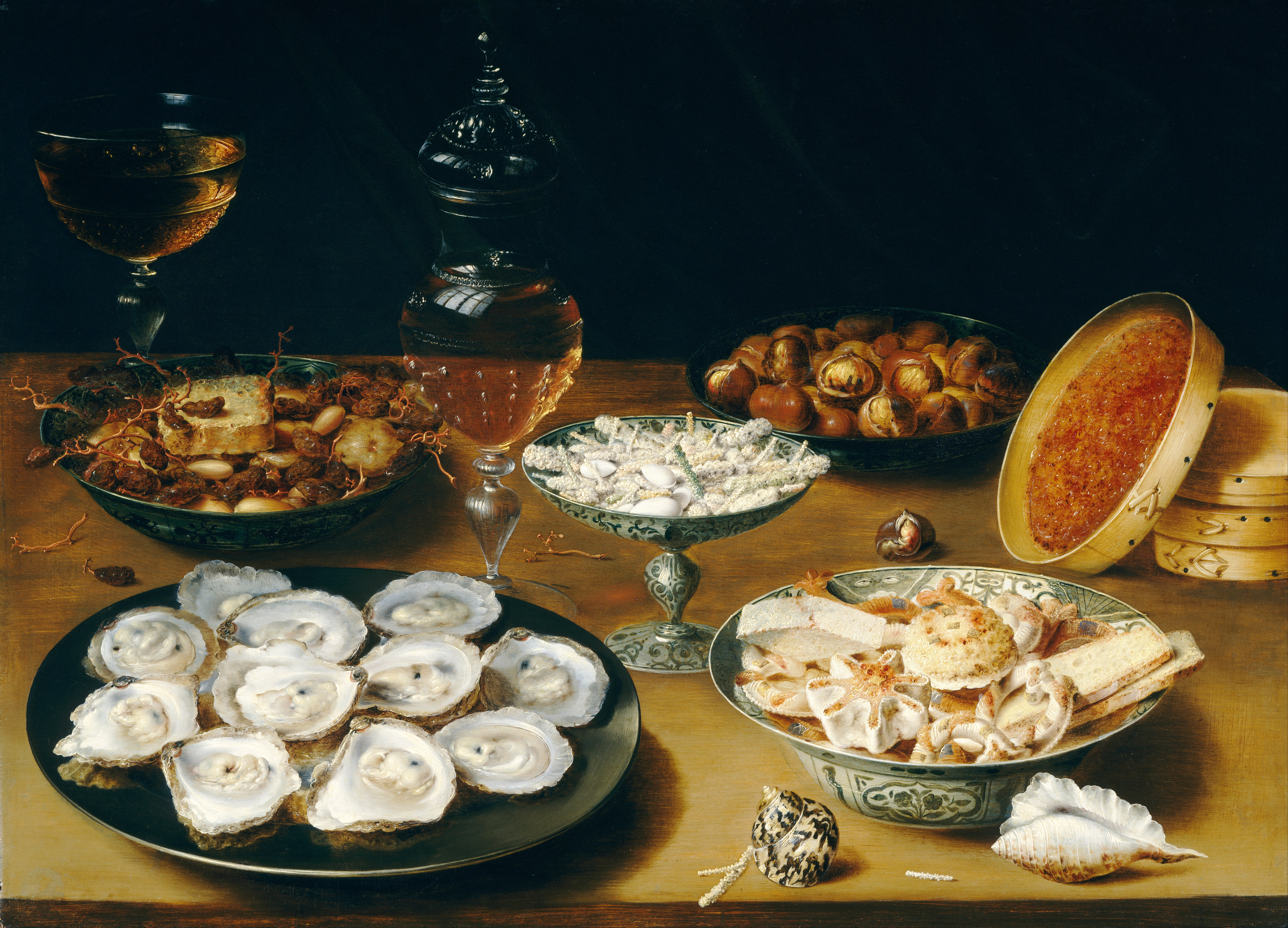
Osias Beert the Elder, Dishes with Oysters, Fruit, and Wine (c. 1620–1625)

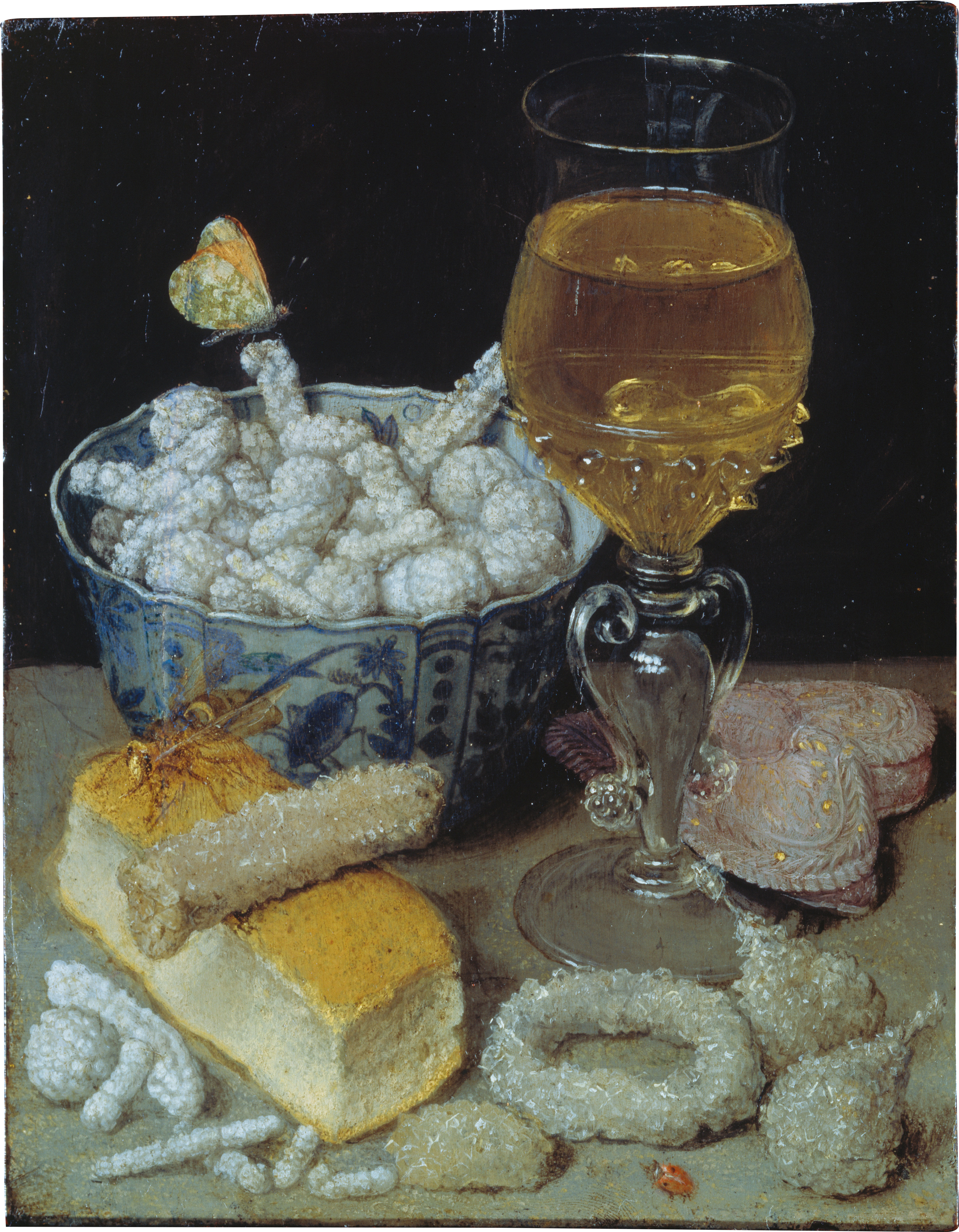
George Flegel (1566–1638), Still-Life with Bread and Confectionery, 1630

=== Southern Europe ===
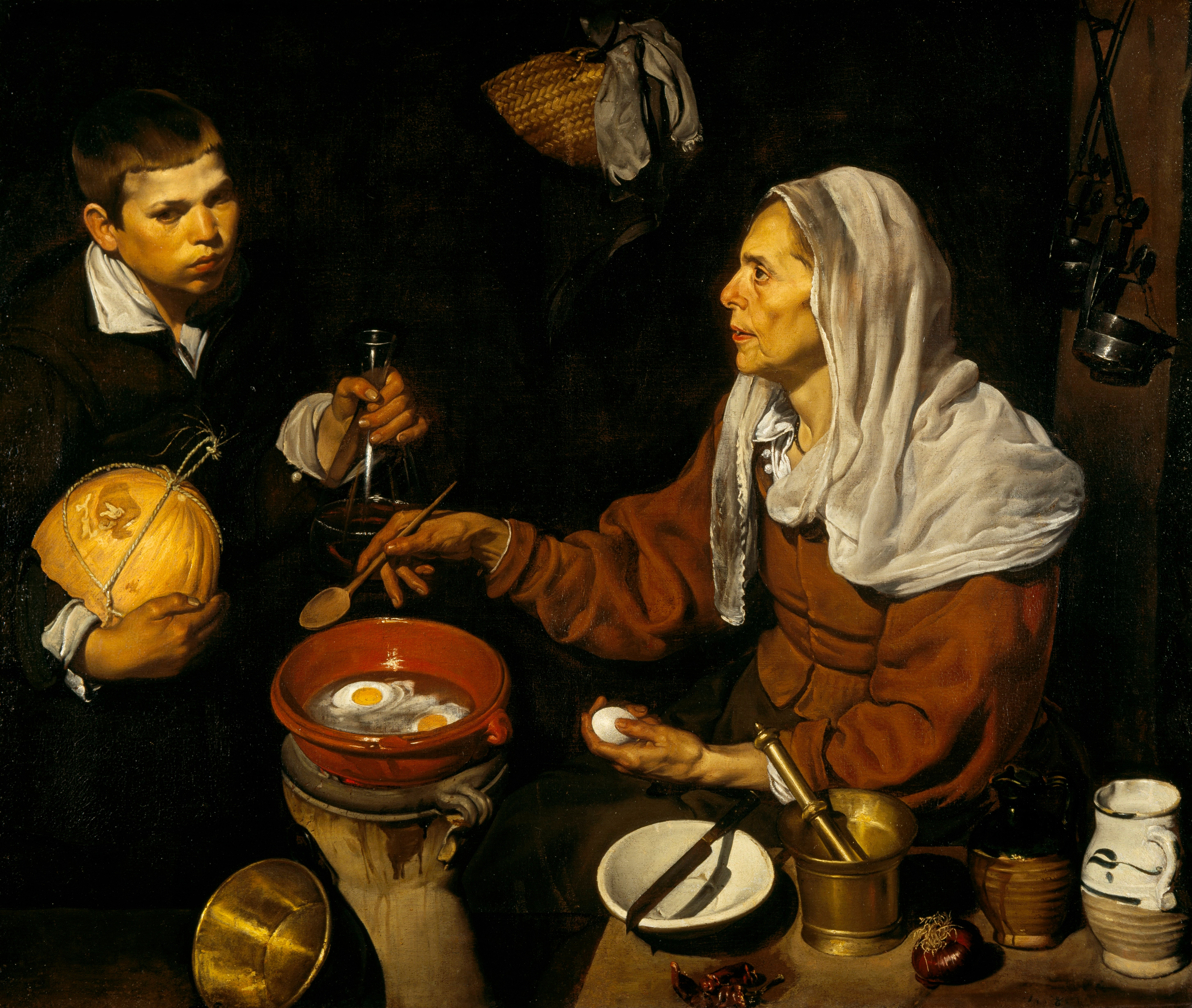
Diego Velázquez, Old Woman Frying Eggs (1618), (National Gallery of Scotland), is one of the earliest examples of bodegón.

In Spanish art, a bodegón is a still-life painting depicting pantry items, such as victuals, game, and drink, often arranged on a simple stone slab, and also a painting with one or more figures, but significant still-life elements, typically set in a kitchen or tavern. Starting in the Baroque period, such paintings became popular in Spain in the second quarter of the 17th century. The tradition of still-life painting appears to have started and was far more popular in the contemporary Low Countries, today Belgium and Netherlands (then Flemish and Dutch artists), than it ever was in southern Europe. Northern still lifes had many subgenres; the breakfast piece was augmented by the trompe-l'œil, the flower bouquet, and the vanitas.

In Spain there were much fewer patrons for this sort of thing, but a type of breakfast piece did become popular, featuring a few objects of food and tableware laid on a table. Still-life painting in Spain, also called bodegones, was austere. It differed from Dutch still life, which often contained rich banquets surrounded by ornate and luxurious items of fabric or glass. The game in Spanish paintings is often plain dead animals still waiting to be skinned. The fruits and vegetables are uncooked. The backgrounds are bleak or plain wood geometric blocks, often creating a surrealist air. Even while both Dutch and Spanish still life often had an embedded moral purpose, the austerity, which some find akin to the bleakness of some of the Spanish plateaus, appears to reject the sensual pleasures, plenitude, and luxury of Dutch still-life paintings.

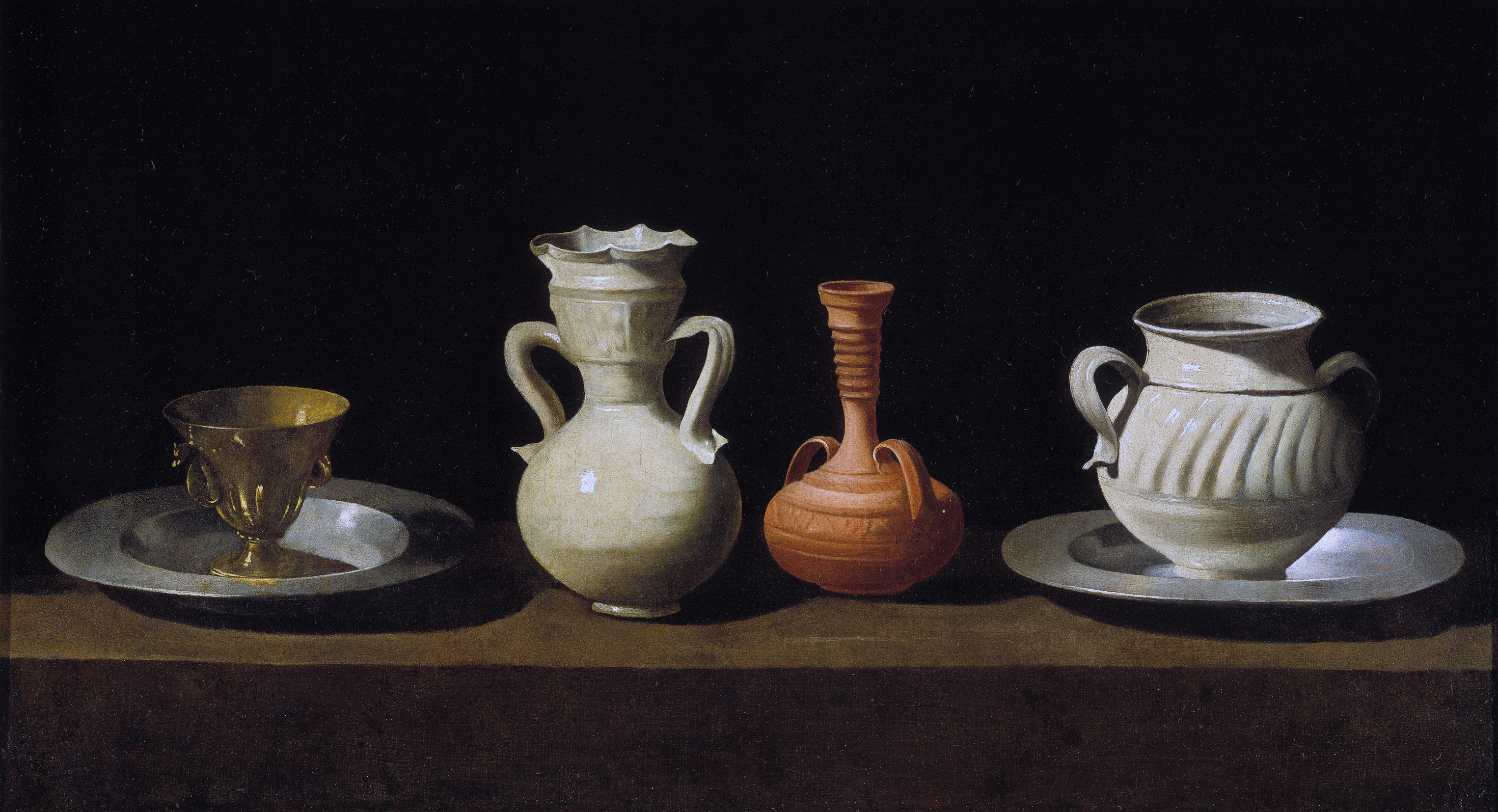
Francisco de Zurbarán, Bodegón or Still Life with Pottery Jars (1636), Museo del Prado, Madrid

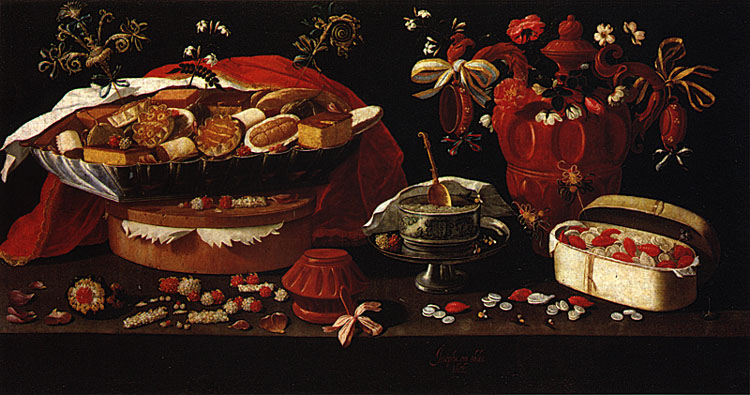
Josefa de Ayala (Josefa de Óbidos), Still-life (c. 1679), Santarém, Municipal Library

Even though Italian still-life painting (in Italian referred to as natura morta, "dead nature") was gaining in popularity, it remained historically less respected than the "grand manner" painting of historical, religious, and mythic subjects. On the other hand, successful Italian still-life artists found ample patronage in their day. Furthermore, women painters, few as they were, commonly chose or were restricted to painting still life; Giovanna Garzoni, Laura Bernasconi, Maria Theresa van Thielen, and Fede Galizia are notable examples.

Many leading Italian artists in other genre, also produced some still-life paintings. In particular, Caravaggio applied his influential form of naturalism to still life. His Basket of Fruit (c. 1595–1600) is one of the first examples of pure still life, precisely rendered and set at eye level. Though not overtly symbolic, this painting was owned by Cardinal Federico Borromeo and may have been appreciated for both religious and aesthetic reasons. Jan Bruegel painted his Large Milan Bouquet (1606) for the cardinal, as well, claiming that he painted it 'fatta tutti del natturel' (made all from nature) and he charged extra for the extra effort. These were among many still-life paintings in the cardinal's collection, in addition to his large collection of curios. Among other Italian still life, Bernardo Strozzi's The Cook is a "kitchen scene" in the Dutch manner, which is both a detailed portrait of a cook and the game birds she is preparing. In a similar manner, one of Rembrandt's rare still-life paintings, Little Girl with Dead Peacocks combines a similar sympathetic female portrait with images of game birds.

In Catholic Italy and Spain, the pure vanitas painting was rare, and there were far fewer still-life specialists. In Southern Europe there is more employment of the soft naturalism of Caravaggio and less emphasis on hyper-realism in comparison with Northern European styles. In France, painters of still lifes (nature morte) were influenced by both the Northern and Southern schools, borrowing from the vanitas paintings of the Netherlands and the spare arrangements of Spain.

=== Italian gallery ===
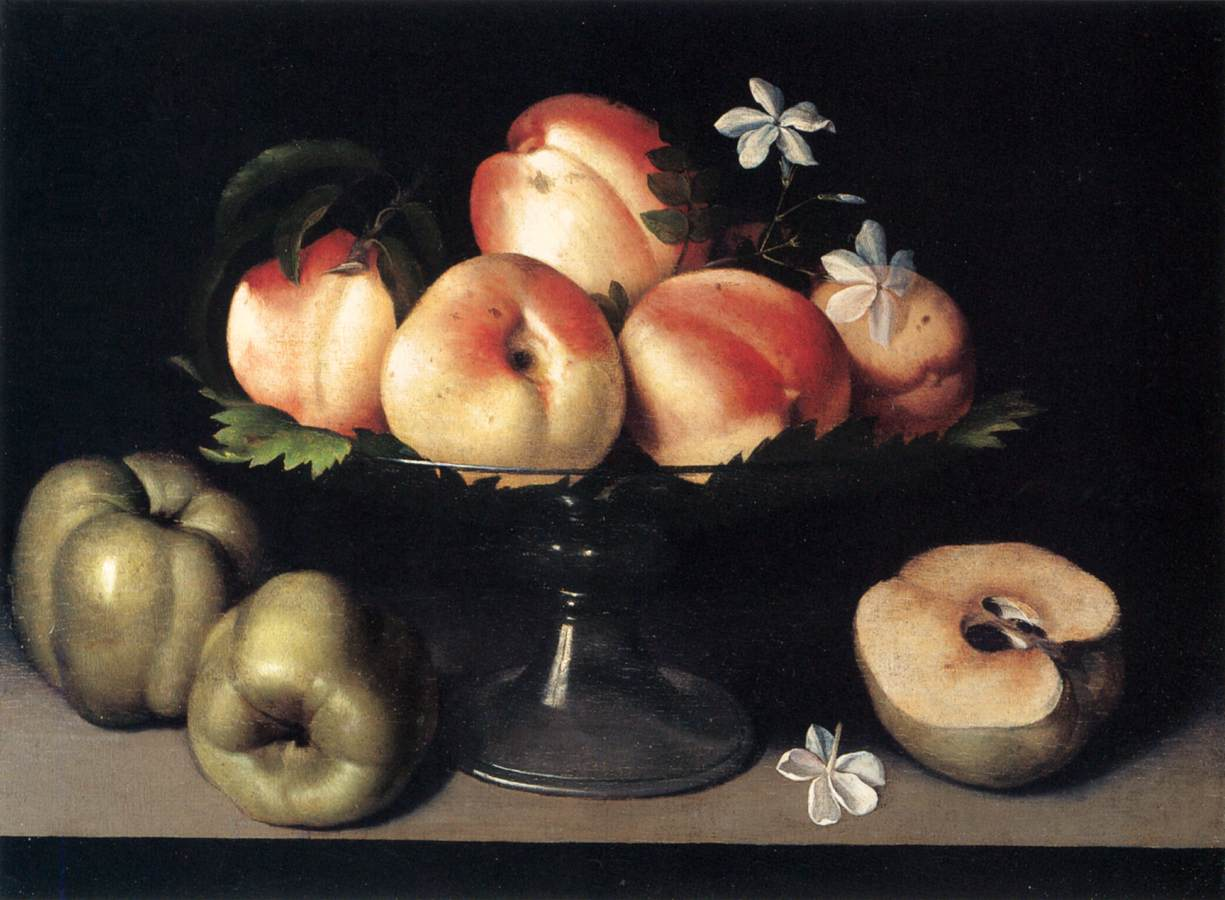
Fede Galizia (1578–1630), Apples in a Dish (c. 1593)

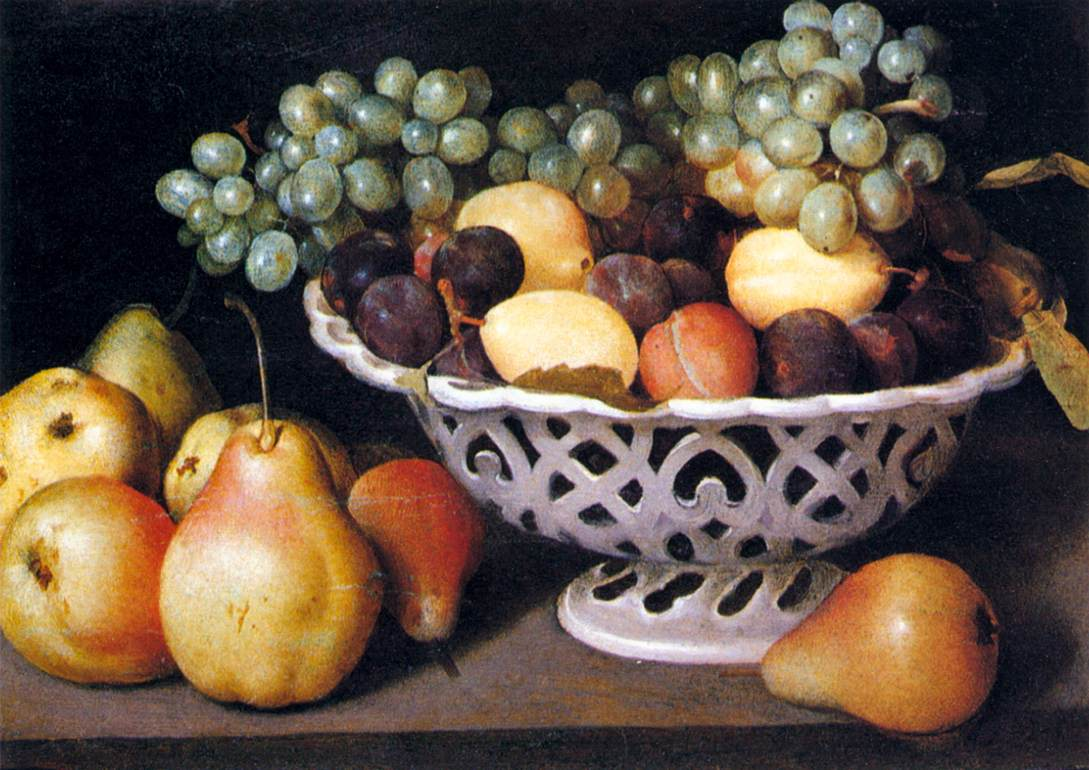
Fede Galizia, (1578–1630), Maiolica Basket of Fruit (c. 1610), private collection

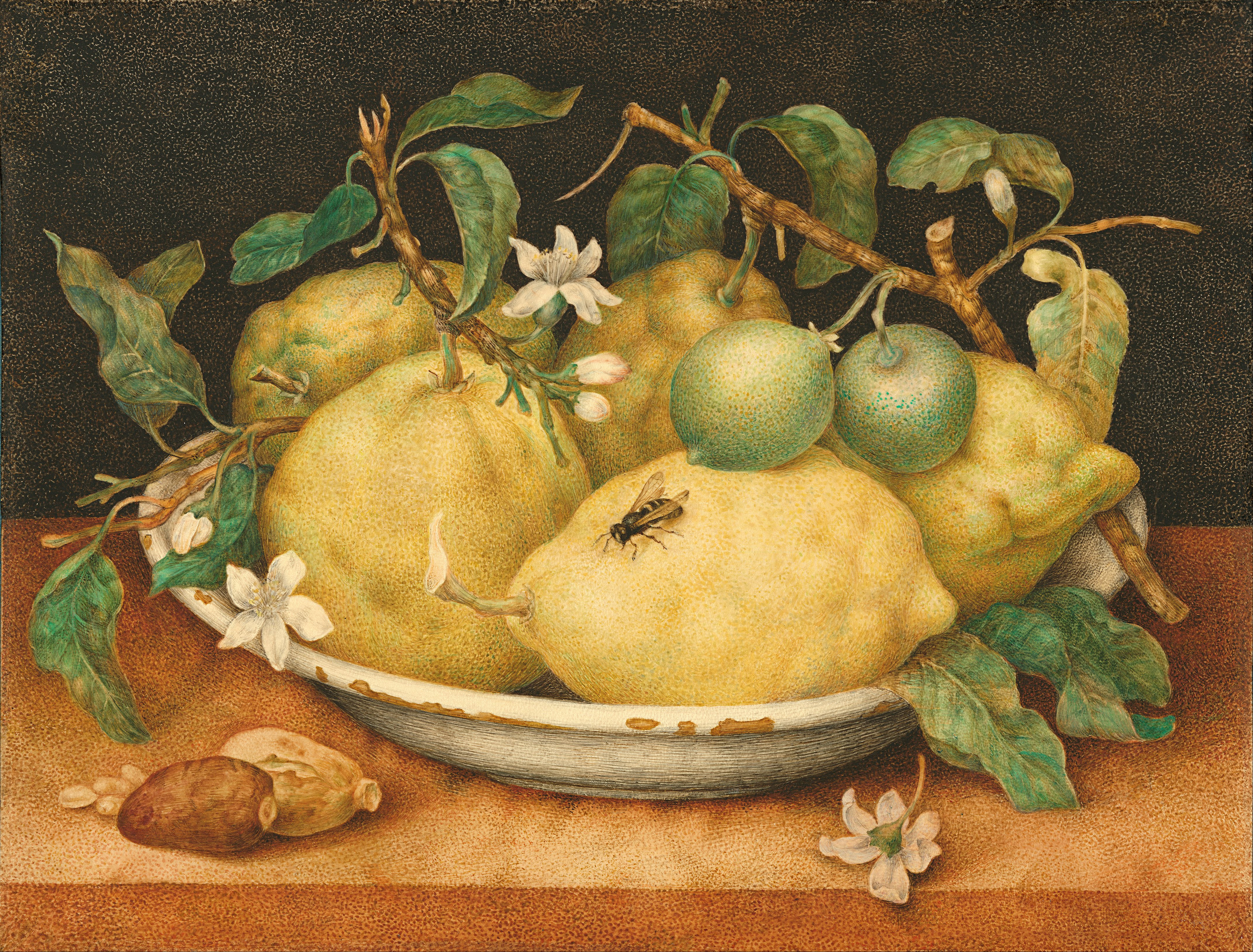
Giovanna Garzoni (1600–1670), Still Life with Bowl of Citrons (1640), tempera on vellum, Getty Museum, Pacific Palisades, Los Angeles, California

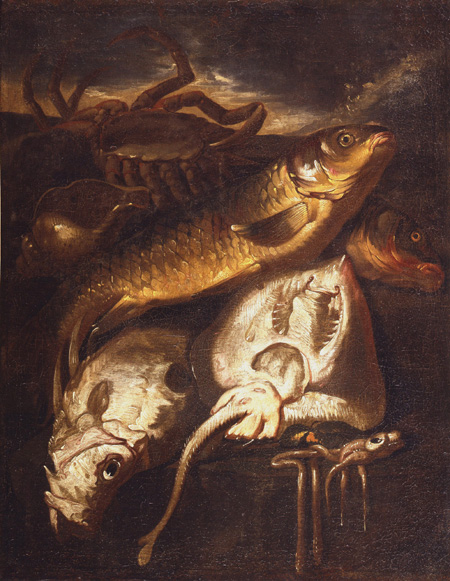
Giacomo Francesco Cipper (1664–1736), Still Life of Fish and Shellfish

== Eighteenth century ==
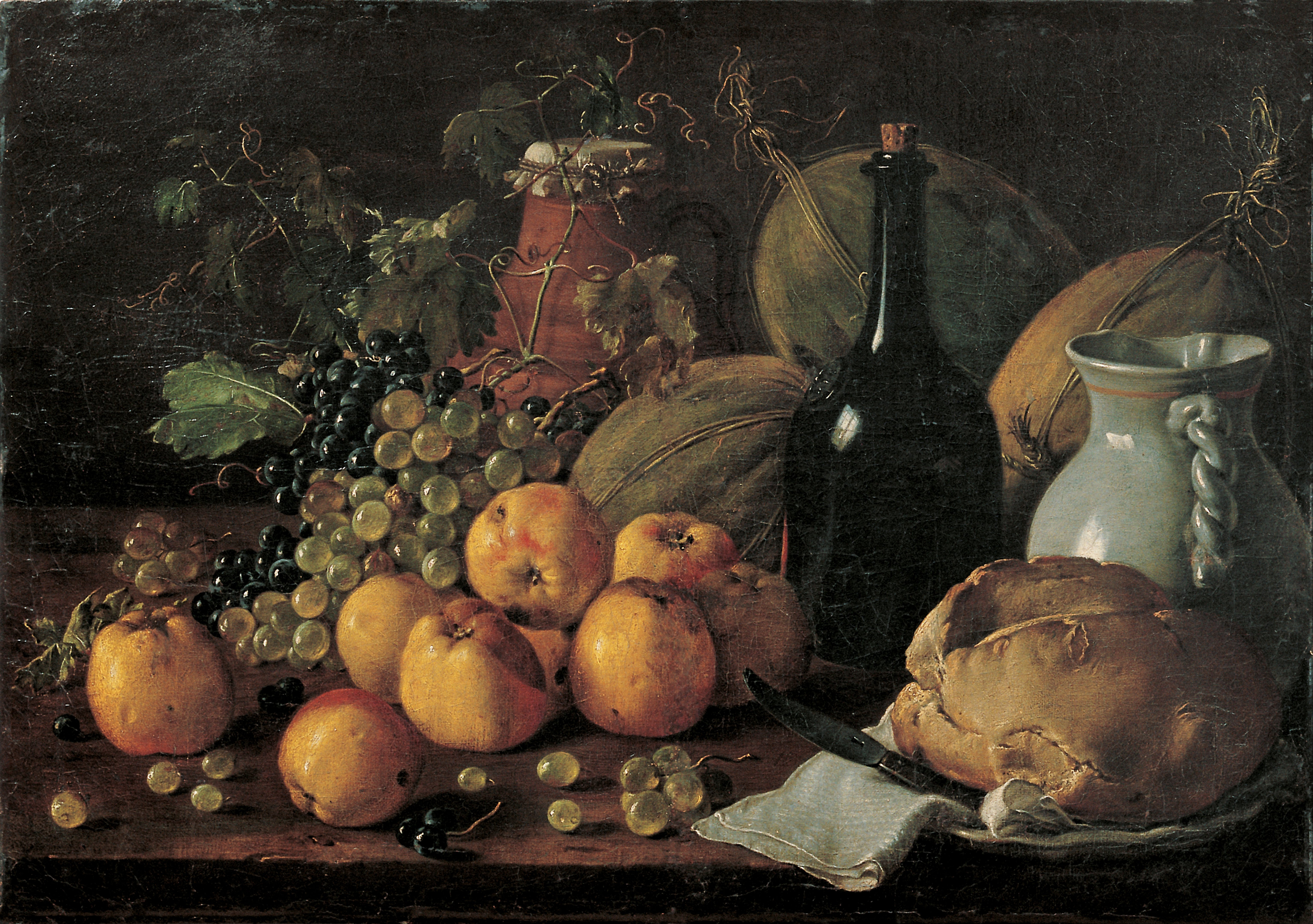
Luis Meléndez (1716–1780), Still Life with Apples, Grapes, Melons, Bread, Jug and Bottle

The 18th century to a large extent continued to refine 17th-century formulae, and levels of production decreased. In the Rococo style floral decoration became far more common on porcelain, wallpaper, fabrics and carved wood furnishings, so that buyers preferred their paintings to have figures for a contrast. One change was a new enthusiasm among French painters, who now form a large proportion of the most notable artists, while the English remained content to import. Jean-Baptiste Chardin painted small and simple assemblies of food and objects in a most subtle style that both built on the Dutch Golden Age masters, and was to be very influential on 19th-century compositions. Dead game subjects continued to be popular, especially for hunting lodges; most specialists also painted live animal subjects. Jean-Baptiste Oudry combined superb renderings of the textures of fur and feather with simple backgrounds, often the plain white of a lime-washed larder wall, that showed them off to advantage.

By the 18th century, in many cases, the religious and allegorical connotations of still-life paintings were dropped and kitchen table paintings evolved into calculated depictions of varied colour and form, displaying everyday foods. The French aristocracy employed artists to execute paintings of bounteous and extravagant still-life subjects that graced their dining table, also without the moralistic vanitas message of their Dutch predecessors. The Rococo love of artifice led to a rise in appreciation in France for trompe-l'œil (French: "trick the eye") painting. Jean-Baptiste Chardin's still-life paintings employ a variety of techniques from Dutch-style realism to softer harmonies.

The bulk of Anne Vallayer-Coster's work was devoted to the language of still life as it had been developed in the course of the seventeenth and eighteenth centuries. During these centuries, the genre of still life was placed lowest on the hierarchical ladder. Vallayer-Coster had a way about her paintings that resulted in their attractiveness. It was the "bold, decorative lines of her compositions, the richness of her colours and simulated textures, and the feats of illusionism she achieved in depicting wide variety of objects, both natural and artificial" which drew in the attention of the Royal Académie and the numerous collectors who purchased her paintings. This interaction between art and nature was quite common in Dutch, Flemish and French still lifes. Her work reveals the clear influence of Jean-Baptiste-Siméon Chardin, as well as 17th-century Dutch masters, whose work has been far more highly valued, but what made Vallayer-Coster's style stand out against the other still-life painters was her unique way of coalescing representational illusionism with decorative compositional structures.

The end of the eighteenth century and the fall of the French monarchy closed the doors on Vallayer-Coster's still-life 'era' and opened them to her new style of florals. It has been argued that this was the highlight of her career and what she is best known for. However, it has also been argued that the flower paintings were futile to her career. Nevertheless, this collection contained floral studies in oil, watercolour and gouache.

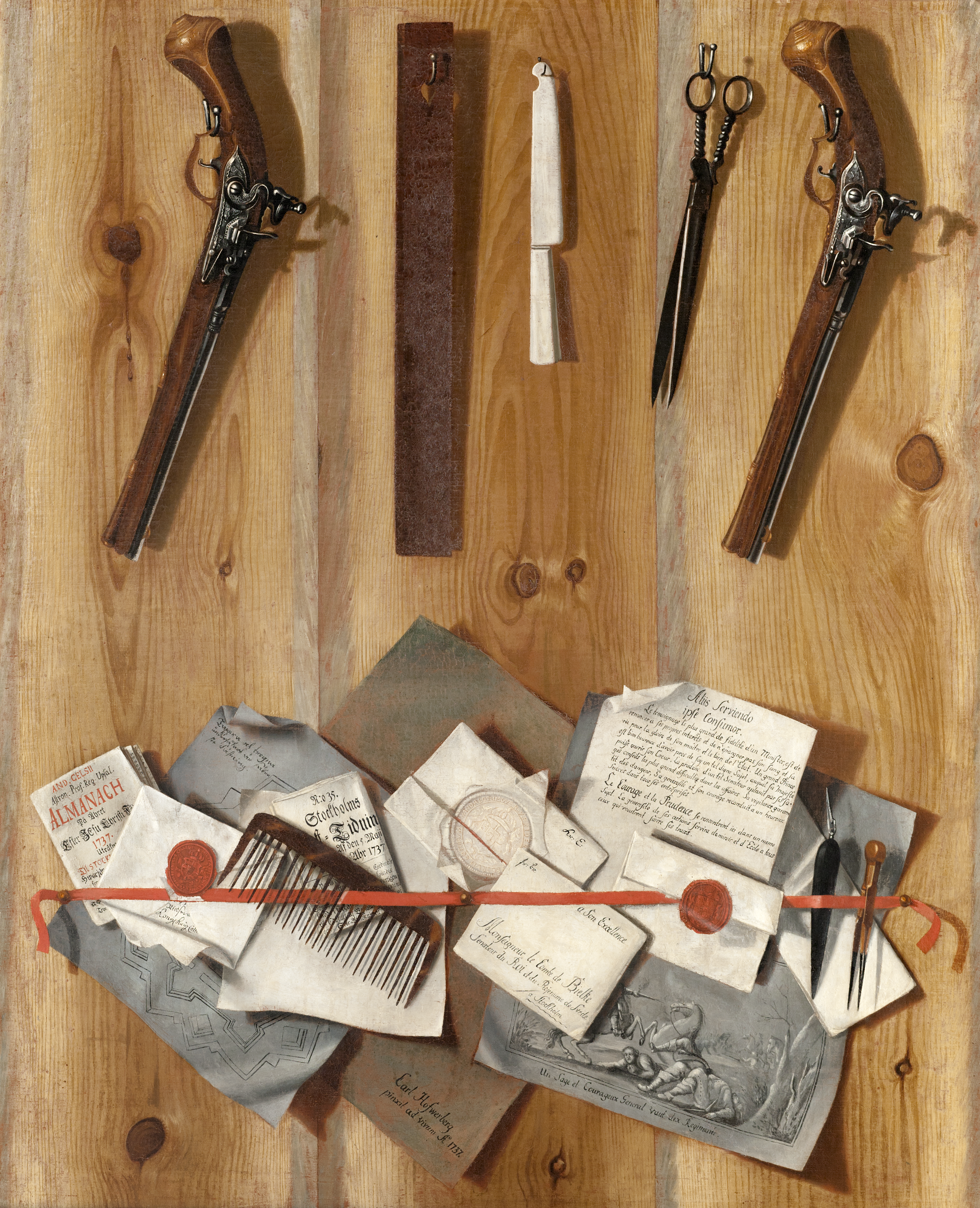
Carl Hofverberg (1695–1765), Trompe-l'œil (1737), Foundation of the Royal Armoury, Sweden

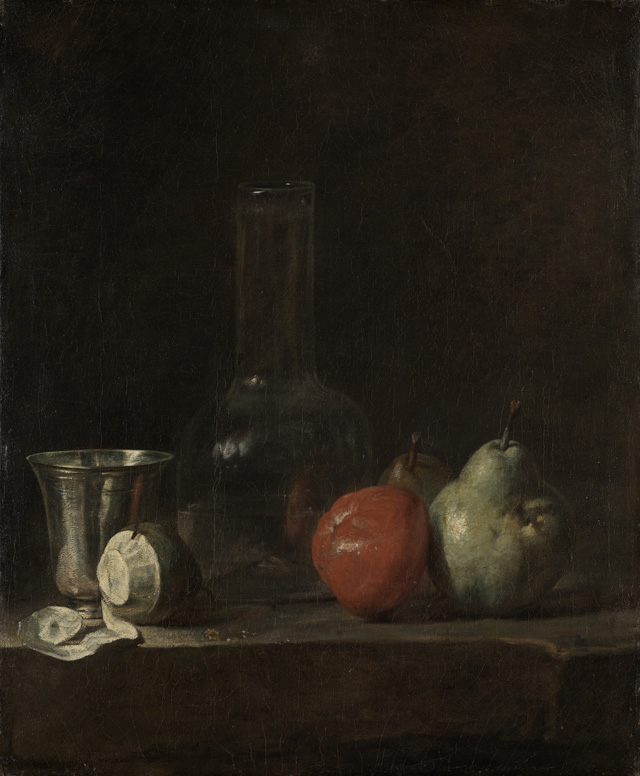
Jean-Baptiste-Siméon Chardin, Still Life with Glass Flask and Fruit (c. 1750)

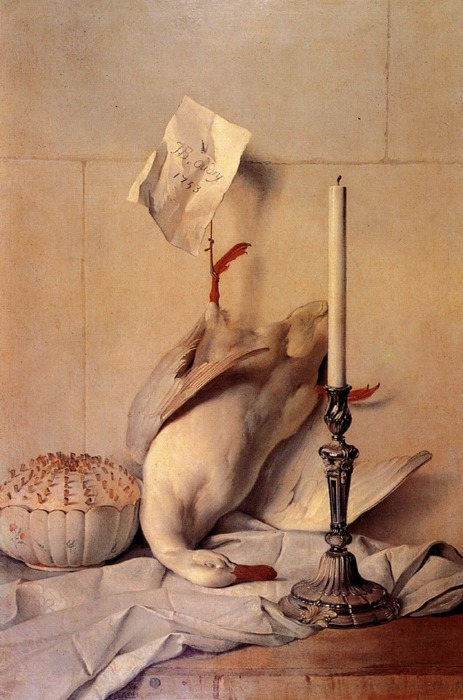
Jean-Baptiste Oudry, The White Duck (1753), stolen from Houghton Hall in 1990

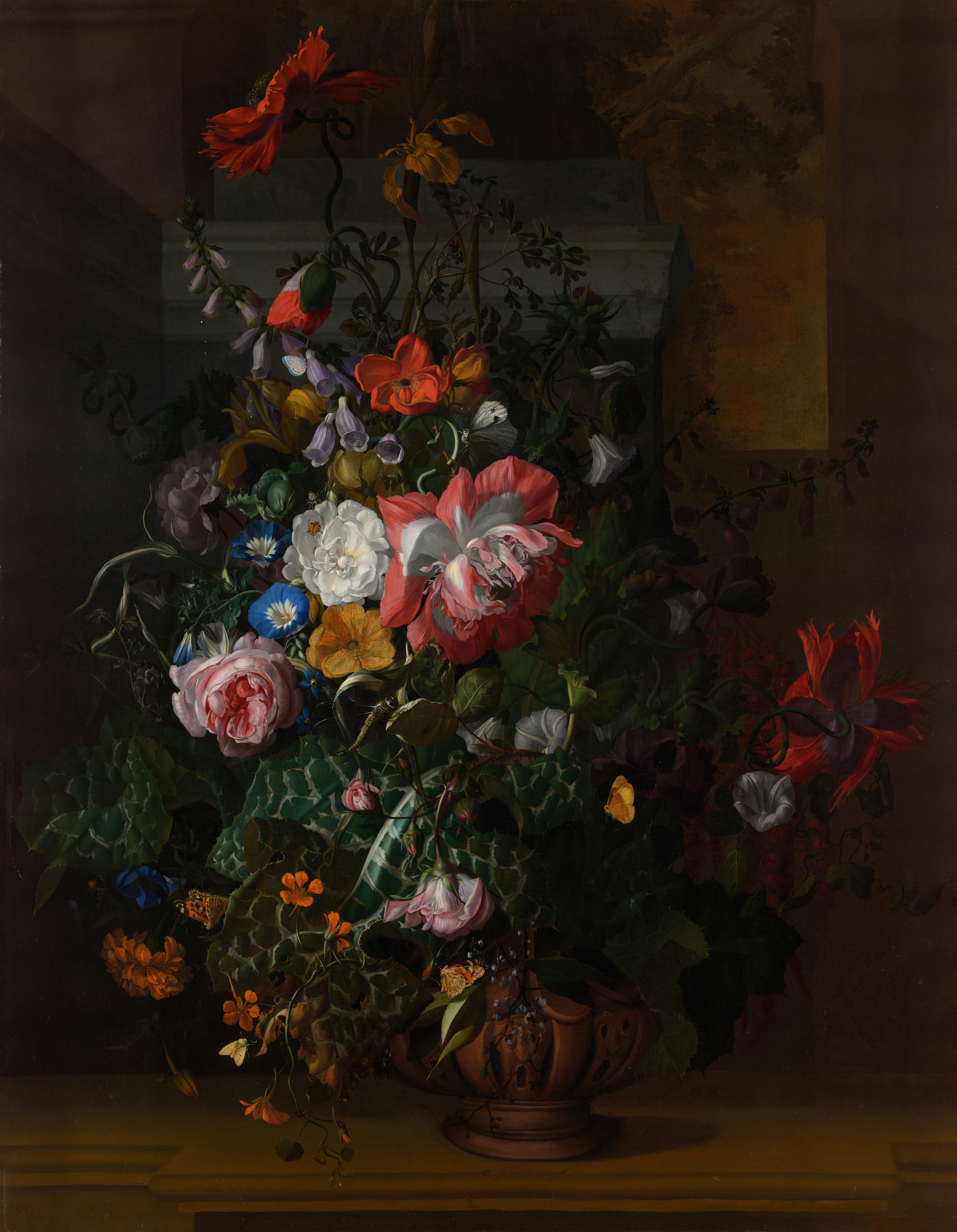
Rachel Ruysch, Roses, Convolvulus, Poppies, and Other Flowers in an Urn on a Stone Ledge (1680s)

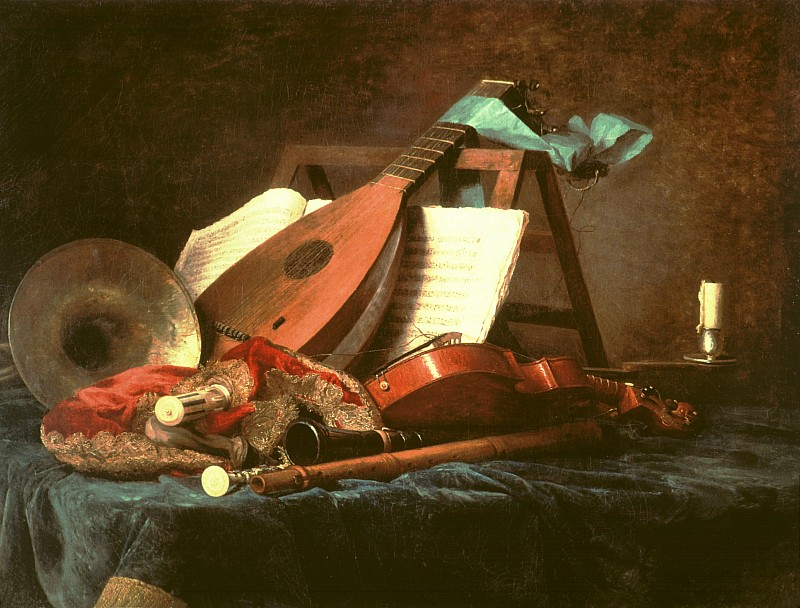
Anne Vallayer-Coster, The Attributes of Music (c. 1770)

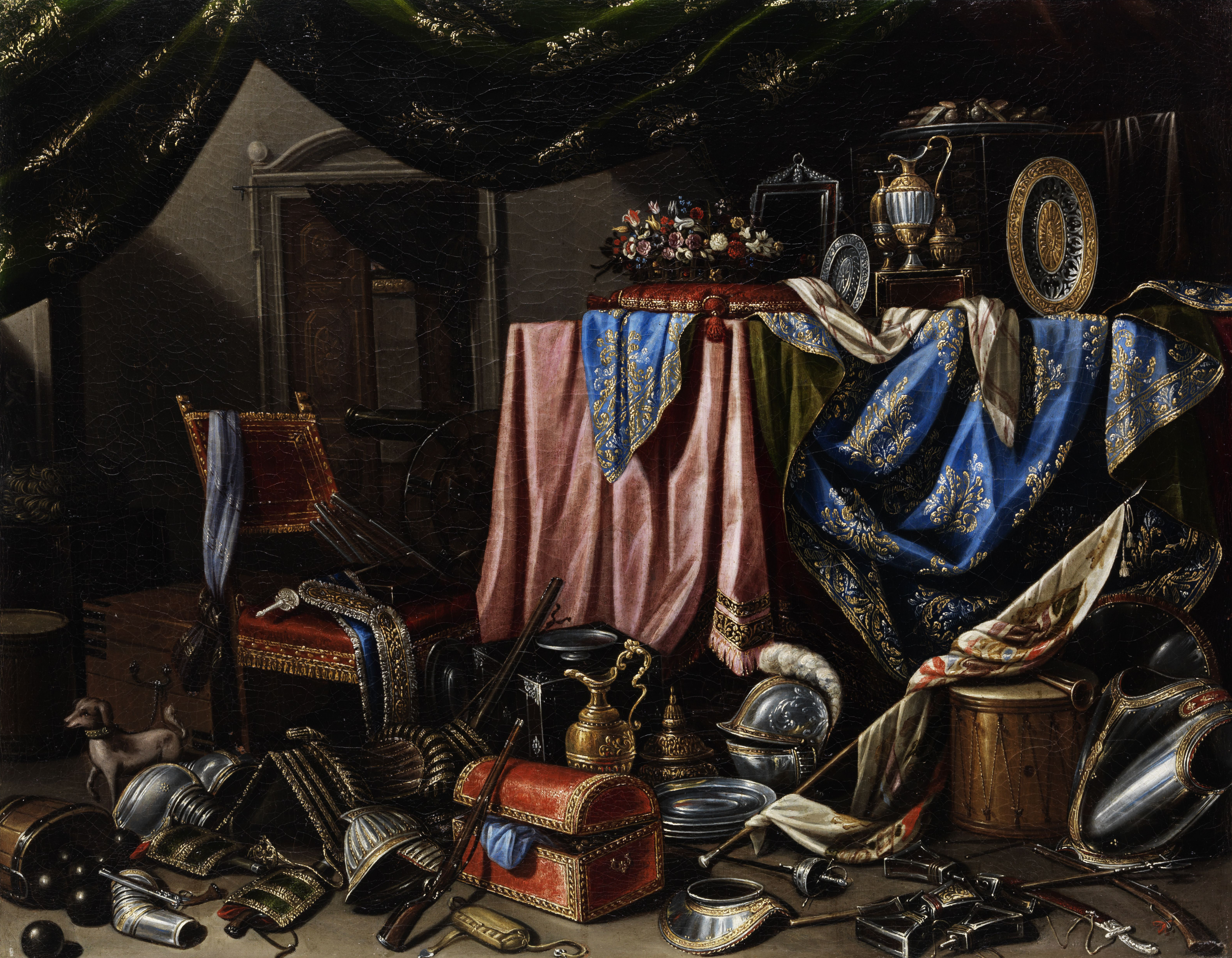
Carlo Manieri, Still Life with Silverware, Pronkstilleven (1662–1700)

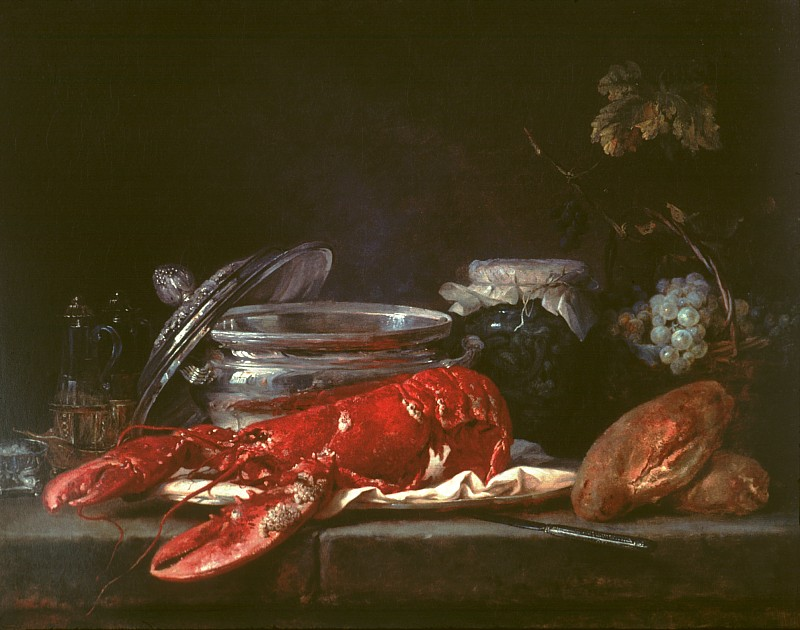
Anne Vallayer-Coster, Still Life With Lobster (c. 1781)

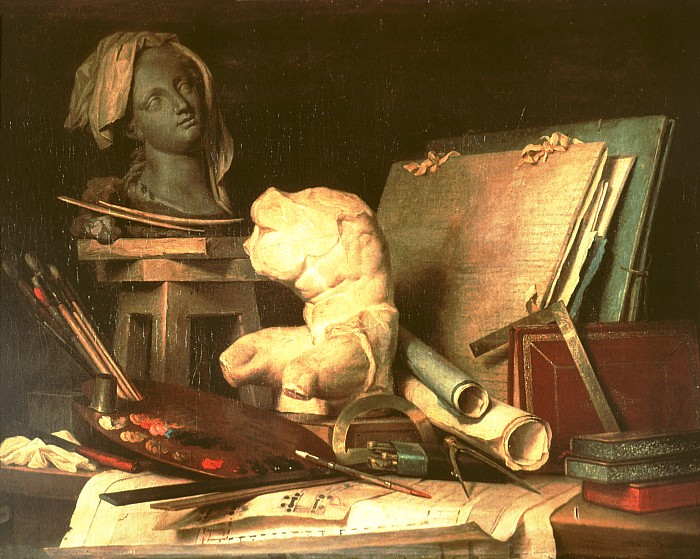
Anne Vallayer-Coster, The Attributes of Painting (c. 1769)

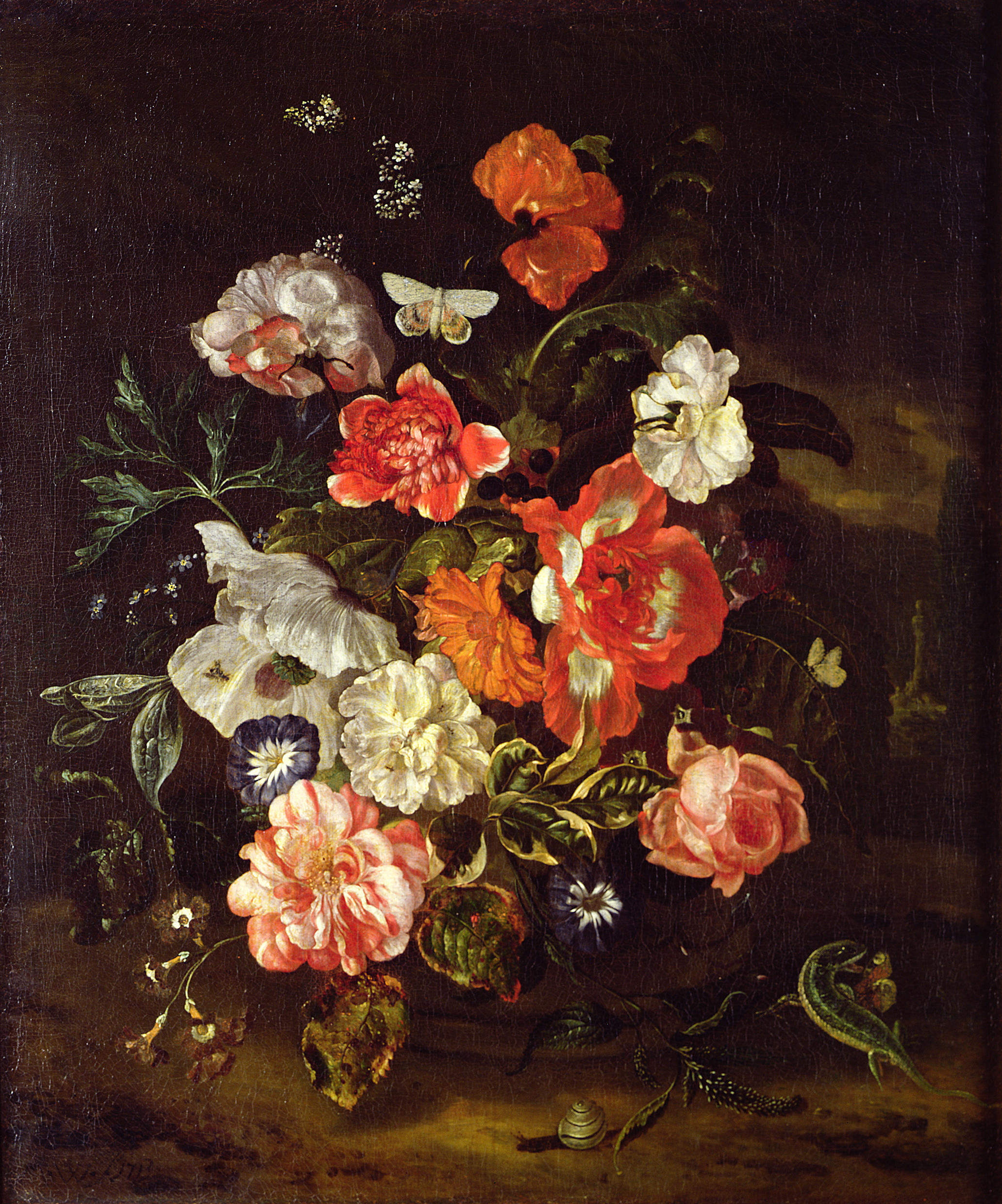
Josina Margareta Weenix, Flower Piece (1713)

== Nineteenth century ==
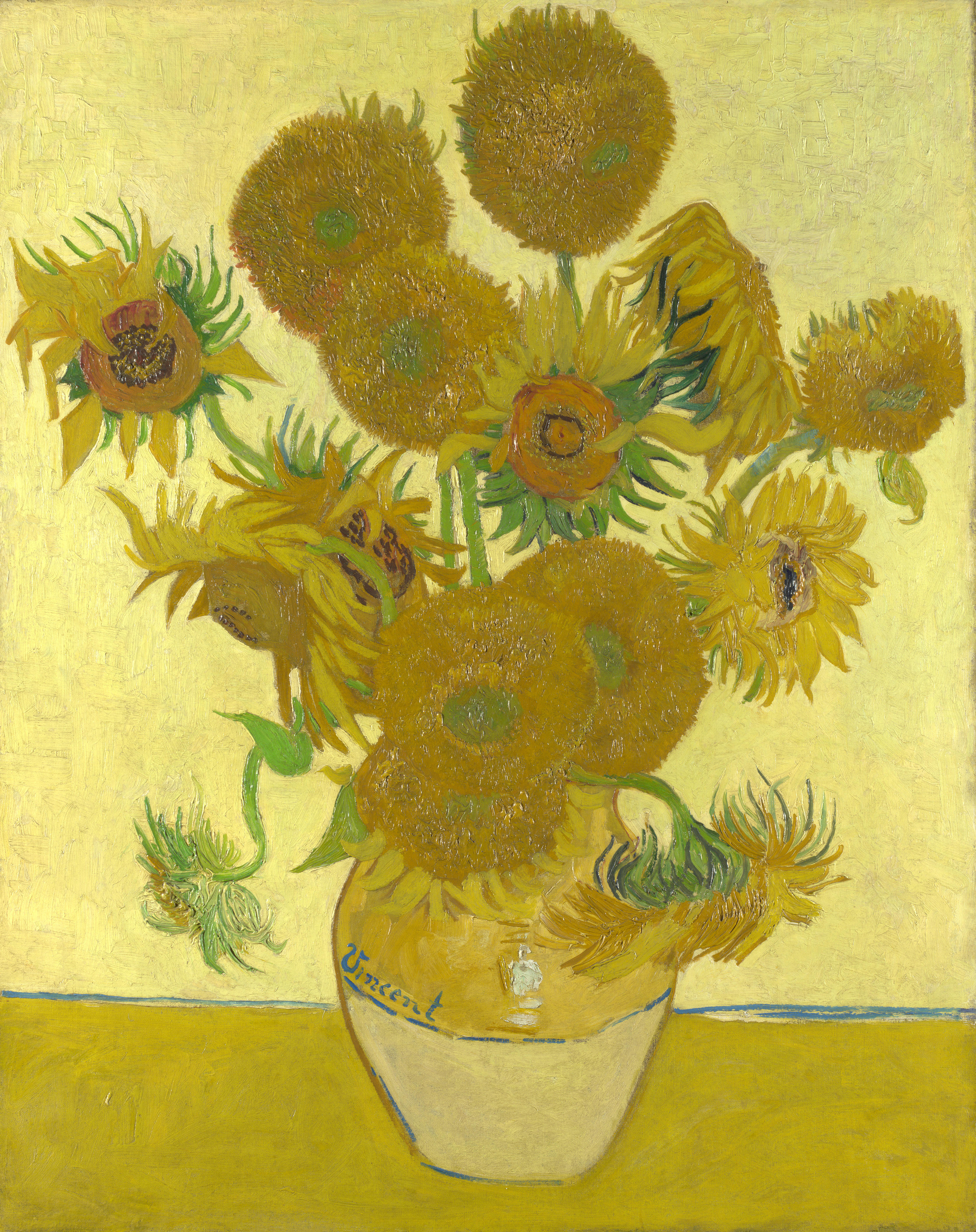
Vincent van Gogh (1853–1890), Sunflowers or Vase with Fifteen Sunflowers (1888), National Gallery (London)

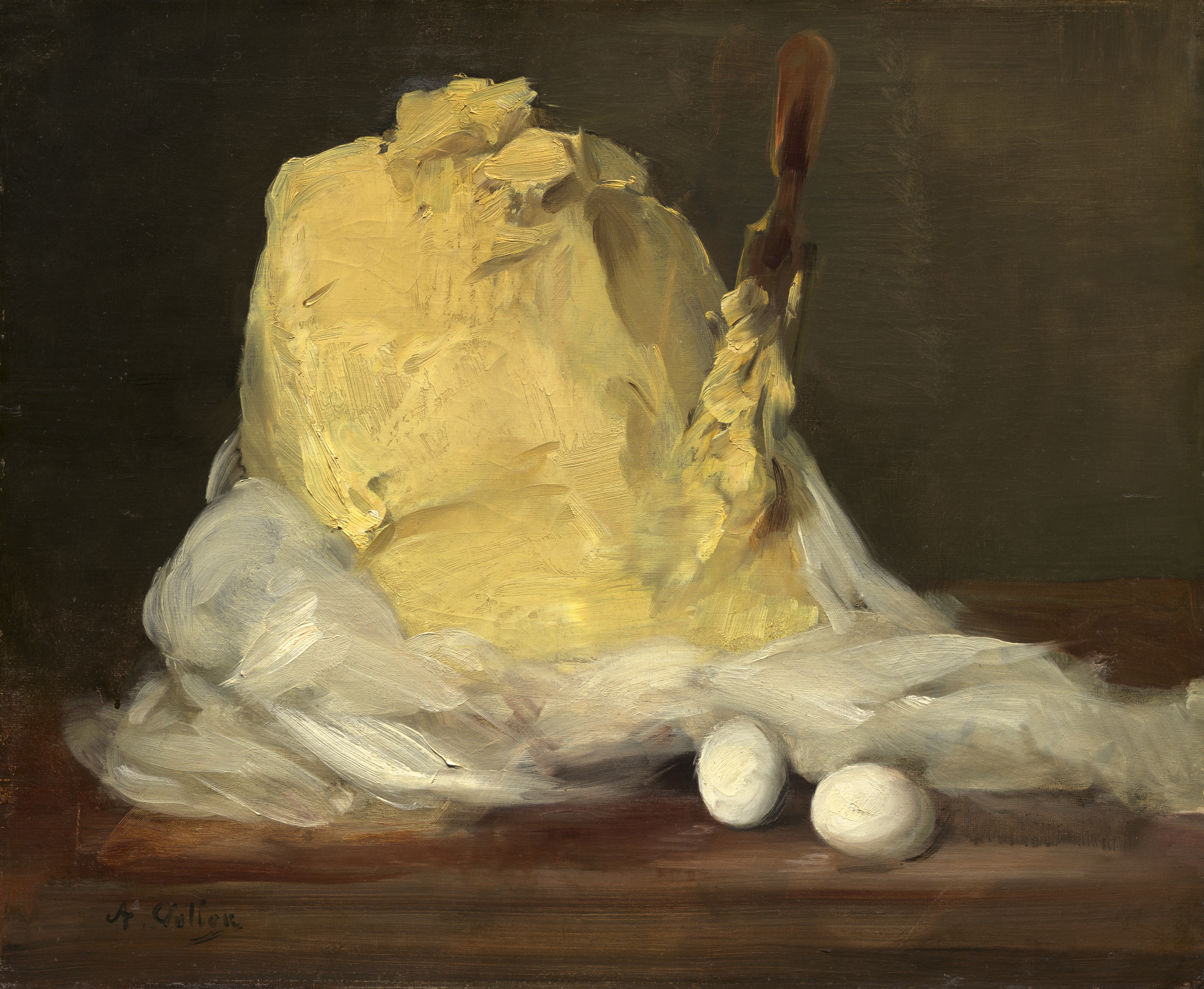
Mound of Butter by Antoine Vollon, 1875–1885

With the rise of the European Academies, most notably the Académie française which held a central role in Academic art, still life began to fall from favor. The Academies taught the doctrine of the "Hierarchy of genres" (or "Hierarchy of Subject Matter"), which held that a painting's artistic merit was based primarily on its subject. In the Academic system, the highest form of painting consisted of images of historical, Biblical or mythological significance, with still-life subjects relegated to the very lowest order of artistic recognition. Instead of using still life to glorify nature, some artists, such as John Constable and Camille Corot, chose landscapes to serve that end.

When Neoclassicism started to go into decline by the 1830s, genre and portrait painting became the focus for the Realist and Romantic artistic revolutions. Many of the great artists of that period included still life in their body of work. The still-life paintings of Francisco Goya, Gustave Courbet, and Eugène Delacroix convey a strong emotional current, and are less concerned with exactitude and more interested in mood. Though patterned on the earlier still-life subjects of Chardin, Édouard Manet's still-life paintings are strongly tonal and clearly headed toward Impressionism. Henri Fantin-Latour, using a more traditional technique, was famous for his exquisite flower paintings and made his living almost exclusively painting still life for collectors.

However, it was not until the final decline of the Academic hierarchy in Europe, and the rise of the Impressionist and Post-Impressionist painters, that technique and colour harmony triumphed over subject matter, and that still life was once again avidly practiced by artists. In his early still life, Claude Monet shows the influence of Fantin-Latour, but is one of the first to break the tradition of the dark background, which Pierre-Auguste Renoir also discards in Still Life with Bouquet and Fan (1871), with its bright orange background. With Impressionist still life, allegorical and mythological content is completely absent, as is meticulously detailed brushwork. Impressionists instead focused on experimentation in broad, dabbing brush strokes, tonal values, and colour placement. The Impressionists and Post-Impressionists were inspired by nature's colour schemes but reinterpreted nature with their own colour harmonies, which sometimes proved startlingly unnaturalistic. As Gauguin stated, "Colours have their own meanings." Variations in perspective are also tried, such as using tight cropping and high angles, as with Fruit Displayed on a Stand by Gustave Caillebotte, a painting which was mocked at the time as a "display of fruit in a bird's-eye view."

Vincent van Gogh's "Sunflowers" paintings are some of the best-known 19th-century still-life paintings. Van Gogh uses mostly tones of yellow and rather flat rendering to make a memorable contribution to still-life history. His Still Life with Drawing Board (1889) is a self-portrait in still-life form, with Van Gogh depicting many items of his personal life, including his pipe, simple food (onions), an inspirational book, and a letter from his brother, all laid out on his table, without his own image present. He also painted his own version of a vanitas painting Still Life with Open Bible, Candle, and Book (1885).

In the United States during Revolutionary times, American artists trained abroad applied European styles to American portrait painting and still life. Charles Willson Peale founded a family of prominent American painters, and as major leader in the American art community, also founded a society for the training of artists and a famous museum of natural curiosities. His son Raphaelle Peale was one of a group of early American still-life artists, which also included John F. Francis, Charles Bird King, and John Johnston. By the second half of the 19th century, Martin Johnson Heade introduced the American version of the habitat or biotope picture, which placed flowers and birds in simulated outdoor environments. The American trompe-l'œil paintings also flourished during this period, created by John Haberle, William Michael Harnett, and John Frederick Peto. Peto specialized in the nostalgic wall-rack painting while Harnett achieved the highest level of hyper-realism in his pictorial celebrations of American life through familiar objects.

=== Nineteenth-century paintings ===
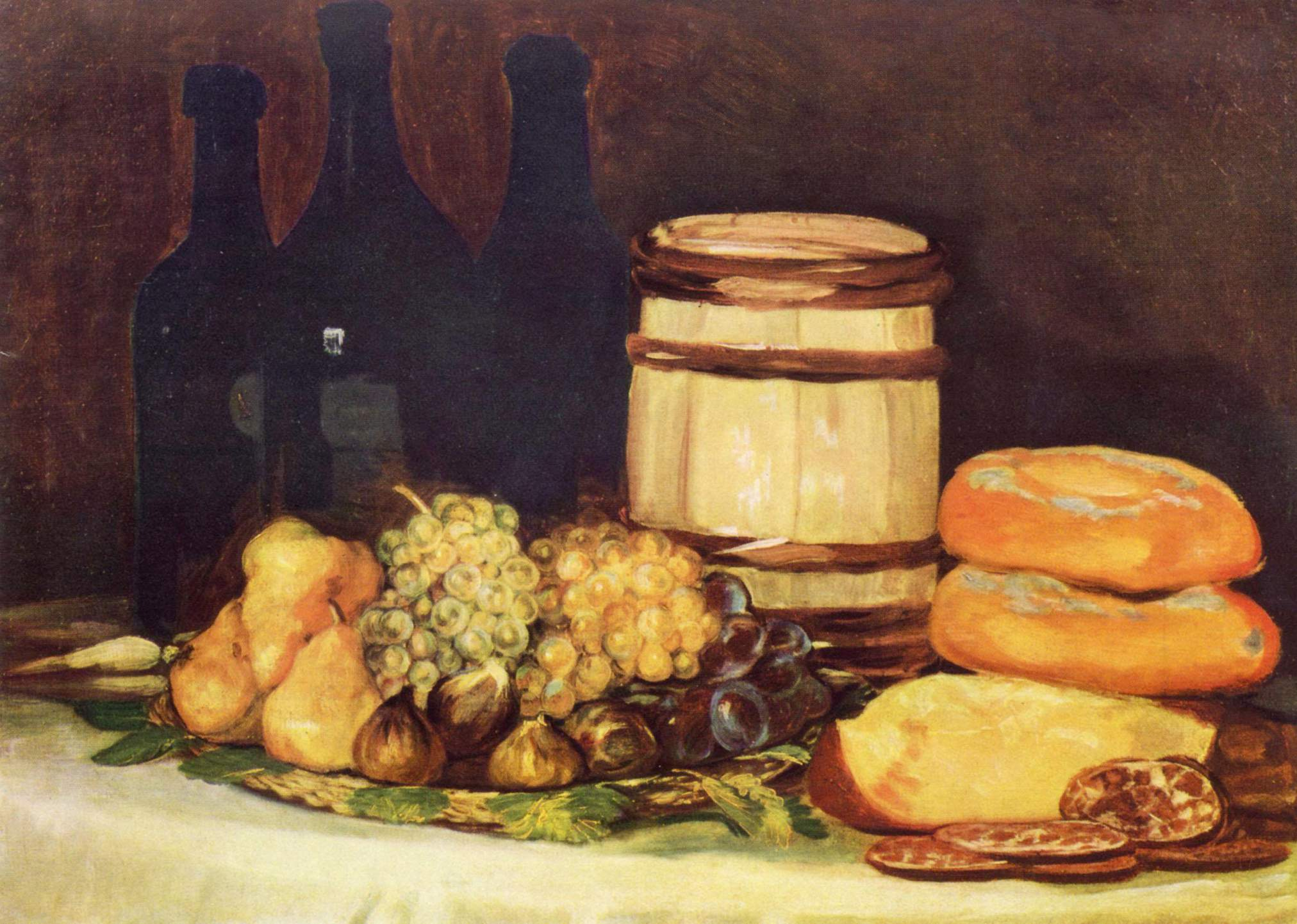
Francisco Goya, Still Life with Fruit, Bottles, Breads (1824–1826)

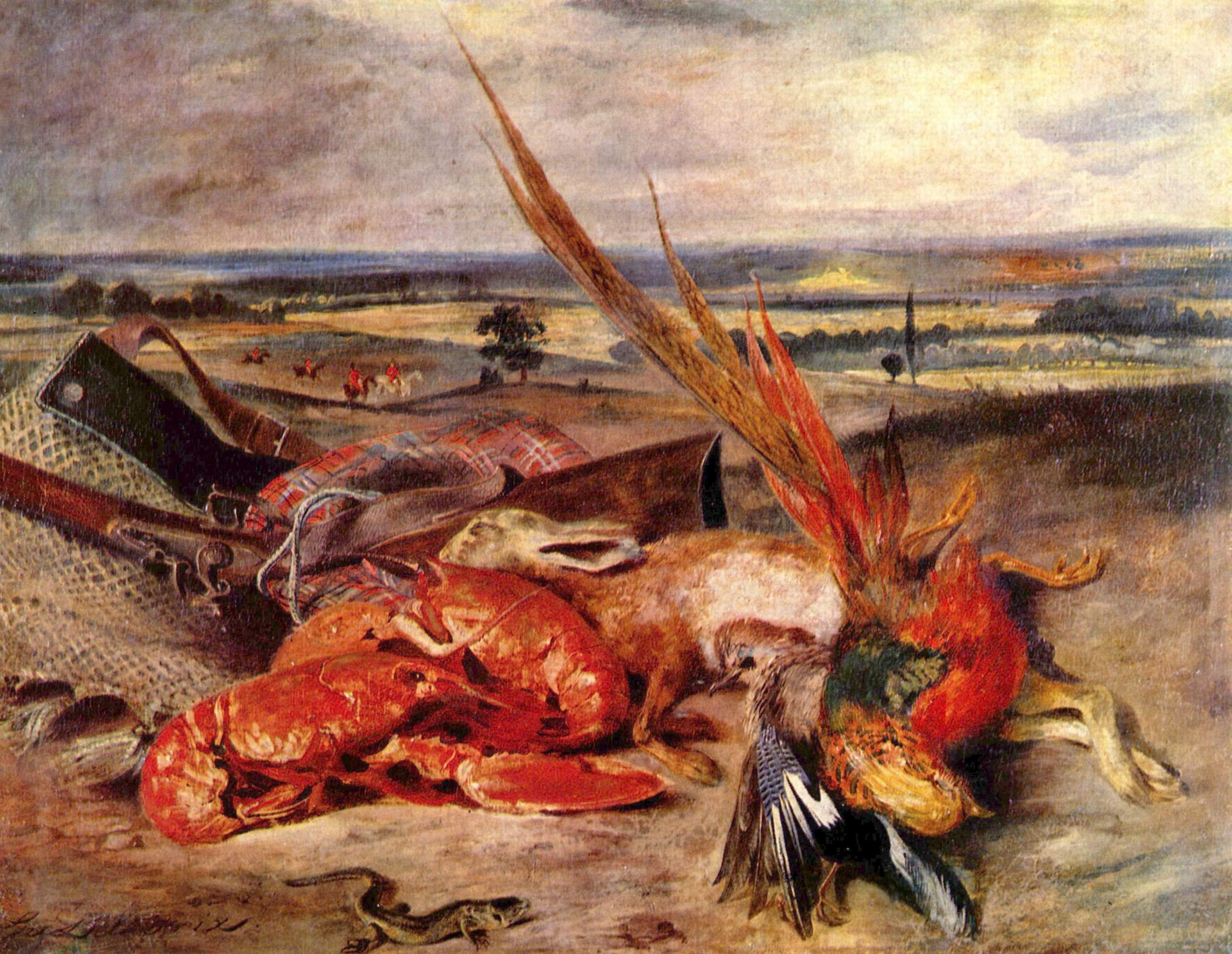
Eugène Delacroix, Still Life with Lobster and trophies of hunting and fishing (1826–1827), Louvre

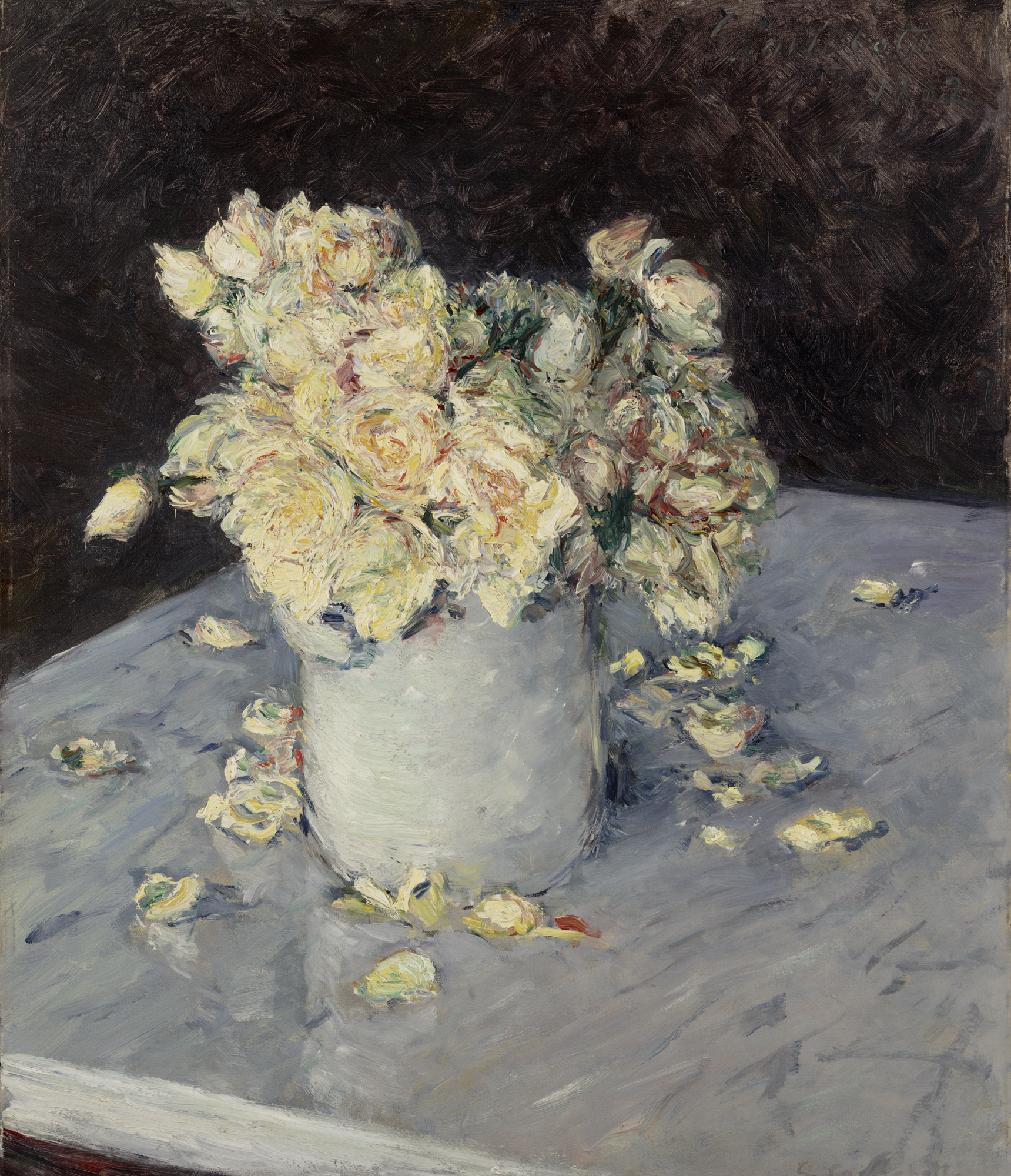
Gustave Caillebotte, (1848–1894), Yellow Roses in a Vase (1882), Dallas Museum of Art

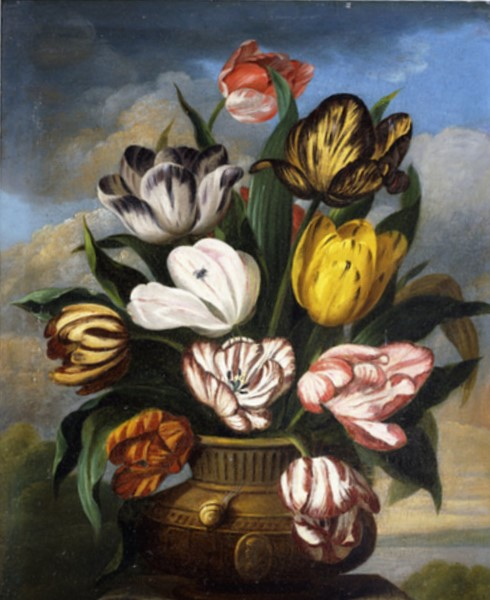
James Sillett, Tulips in a Vase, with a Caterpillar (undated), Norfolk Museums Collections

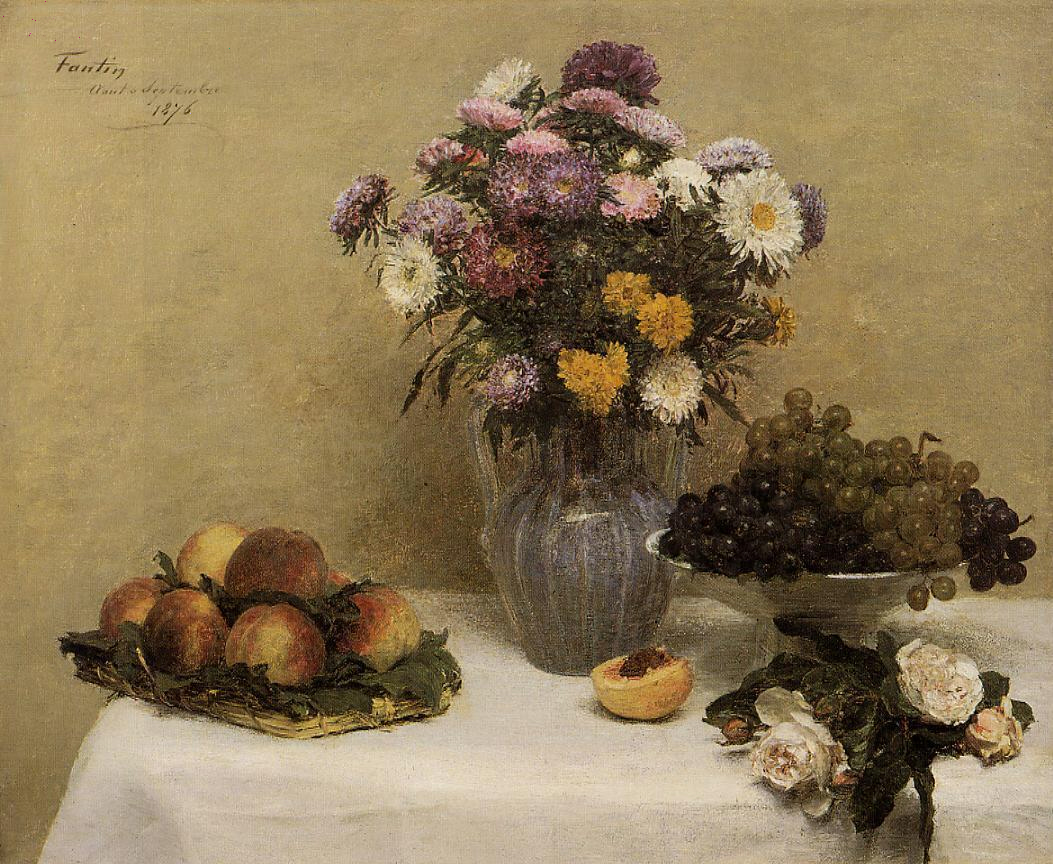
Henri Fantin-Latour, (1836–1904), White Roses, Chrysanthemums in a Vase, Peaches and Grapes on a Table with a White Tablecloth (1867)

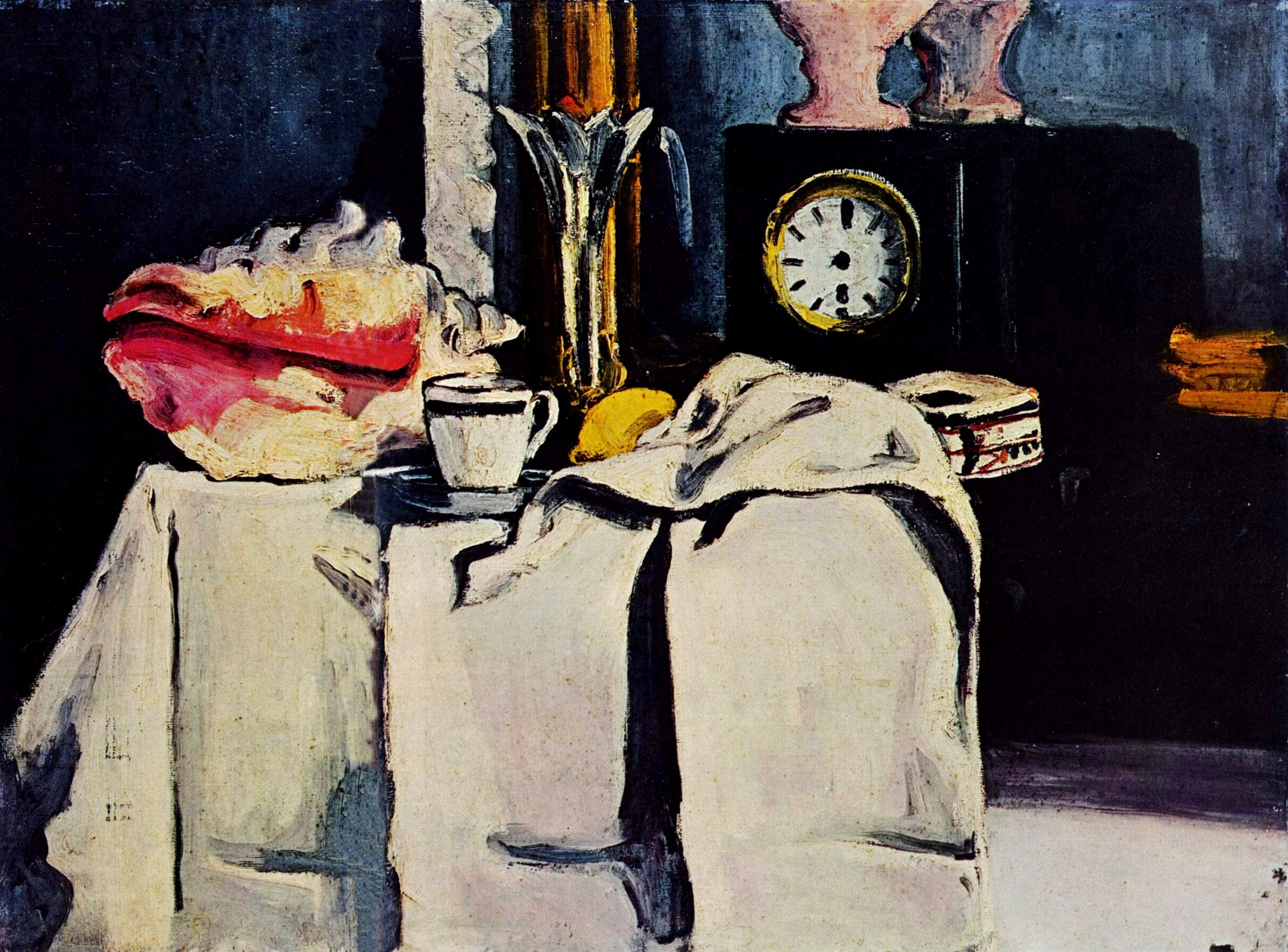
Paul Cézanne (1839–1906), The Black Marble Clock (1869–1871), private collection

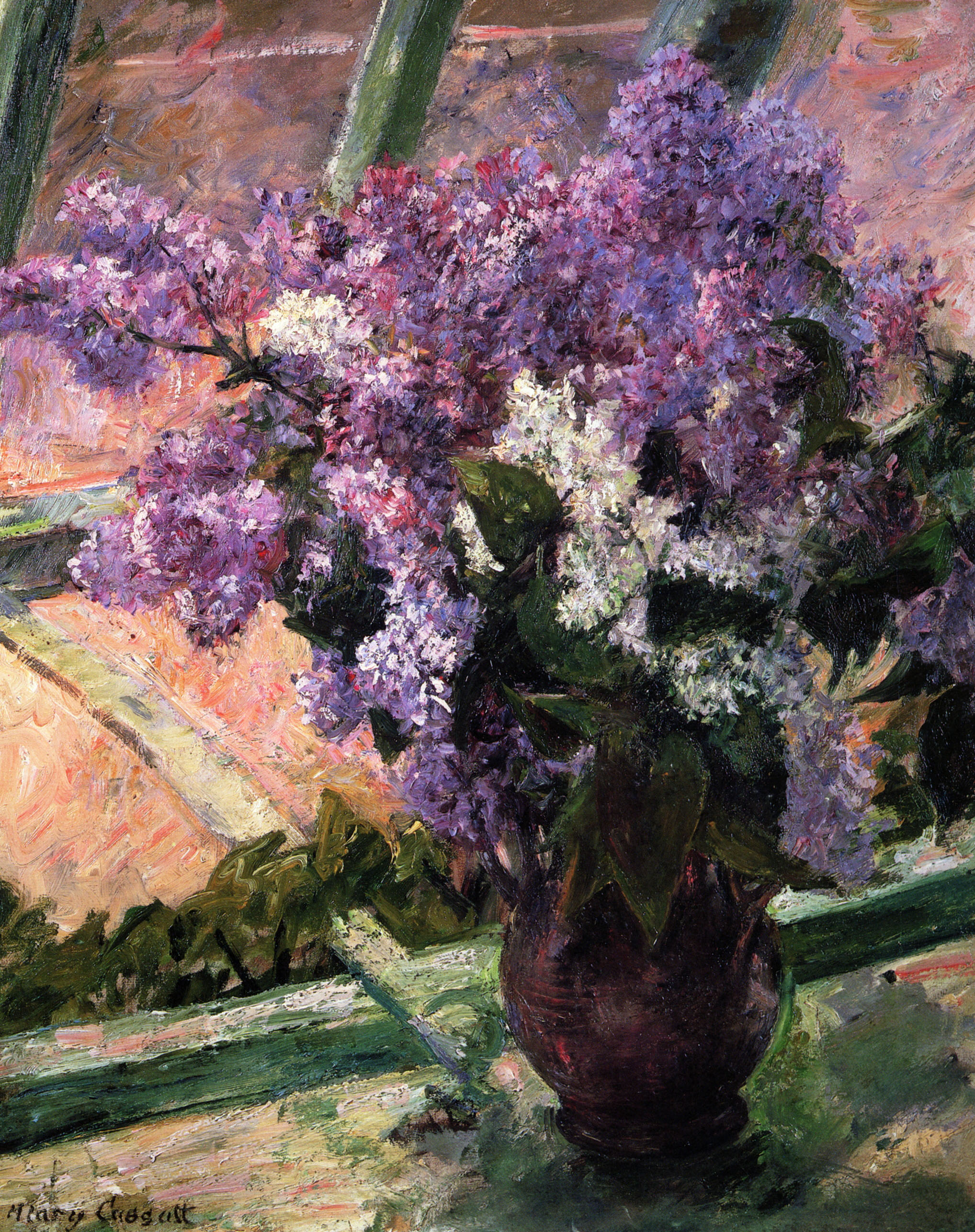
Mary Cassatt, (1844–1926), Lilacs in a Window (1880)

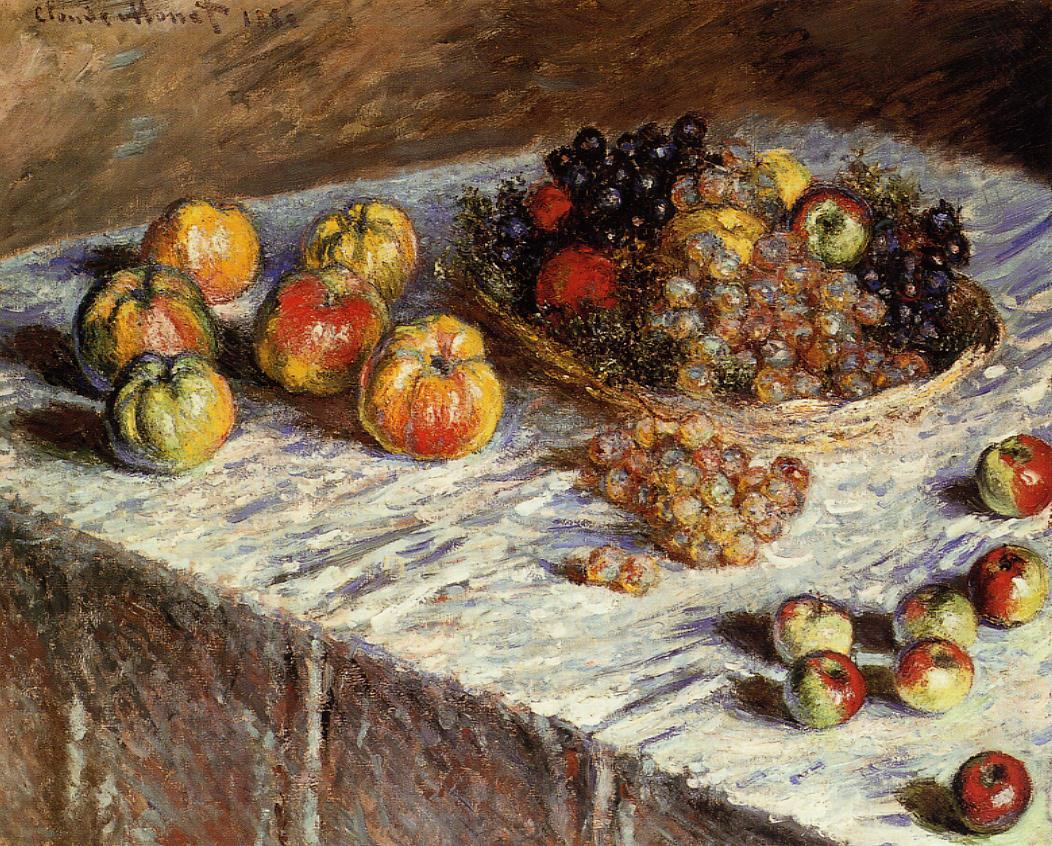
Claude Monet (1840–1926), Still-Life with Apples and Grapes (1880), Art Institute of Chicago

Édouard Manet (1832–1883), Carnations and Clematis in a Crystal Vase (1883), Musée d'Orsay, Paris

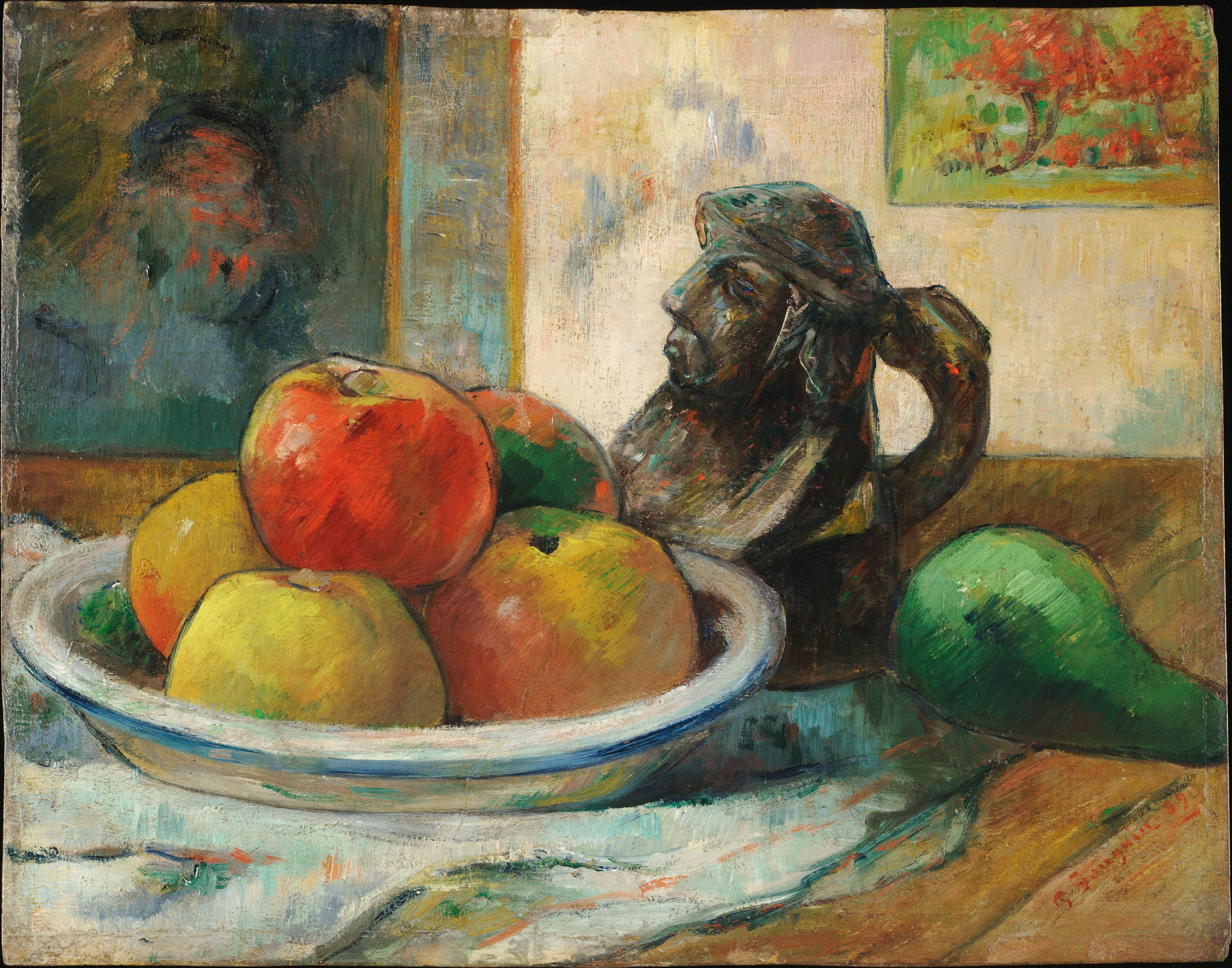
Paul Gauguin, Still Life with Apples, a Pear, and a Ceramic Portrait Jug (1889), Fogg Museum, Cambridge, Massachusetts

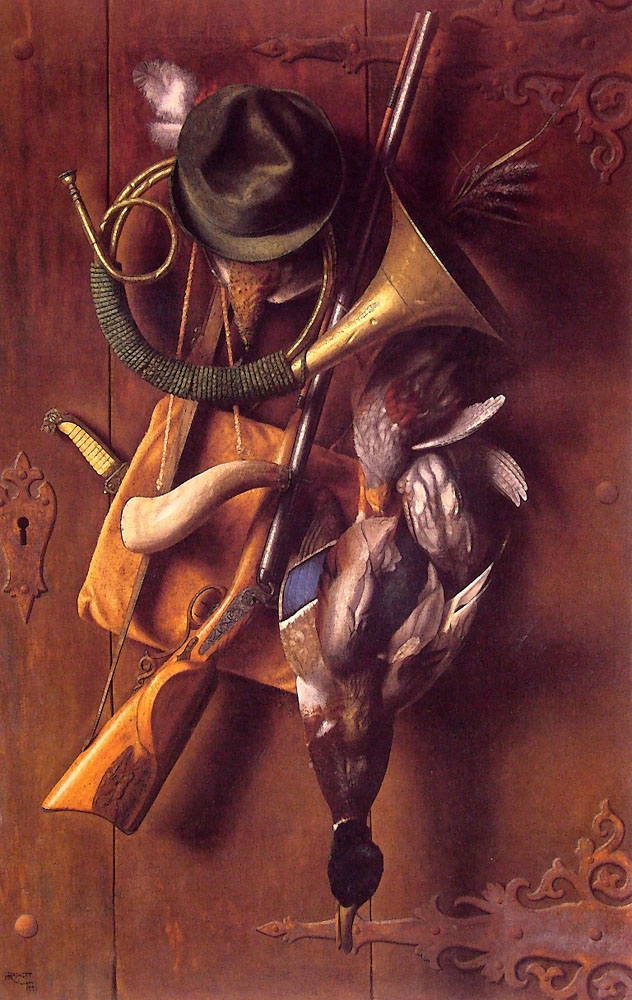
William Harnett (1848–1892), After the Hunt (1883)

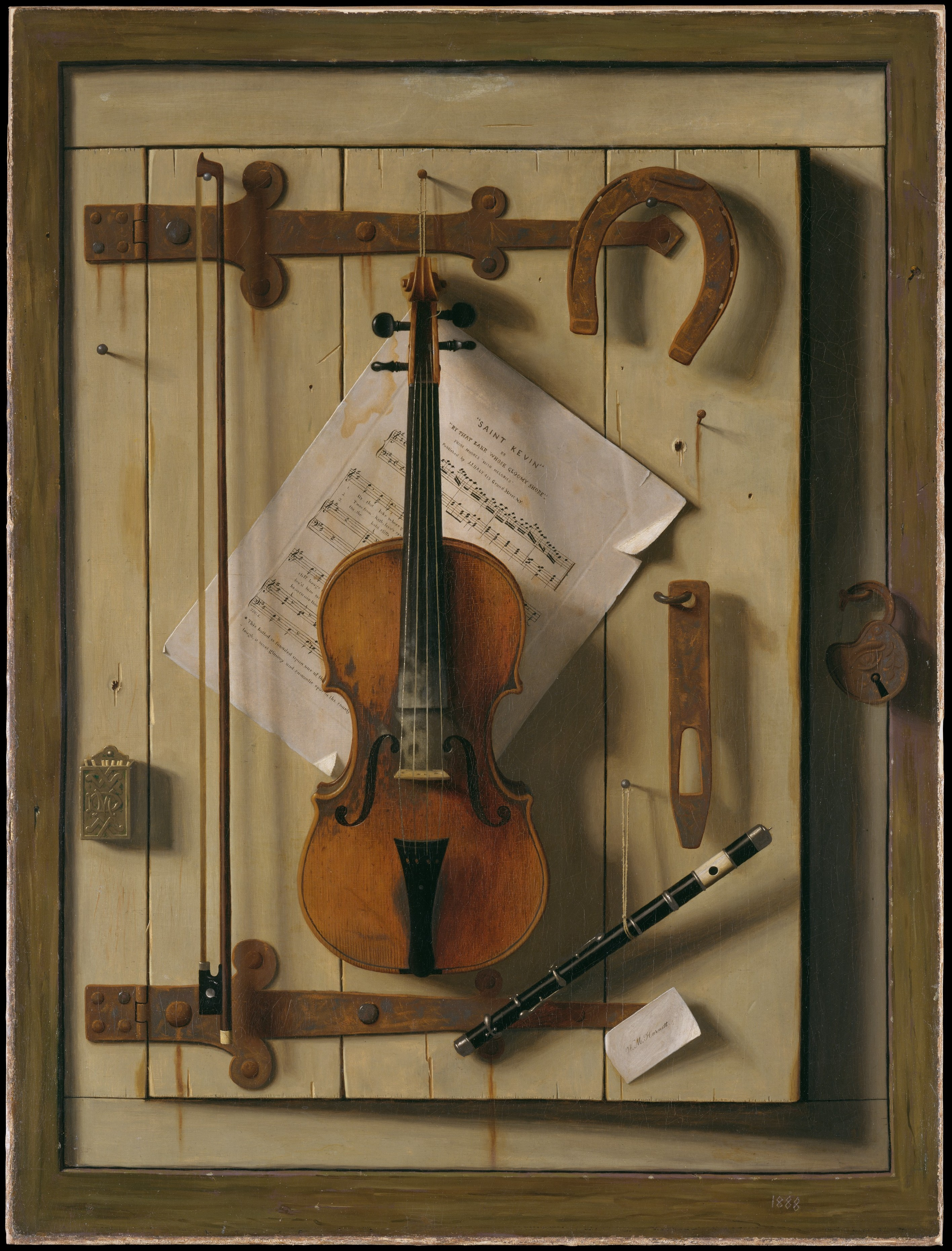
William Harnett (1848–1892), Still life violin and music (1888), Metropolitan Museum of Art, New York City

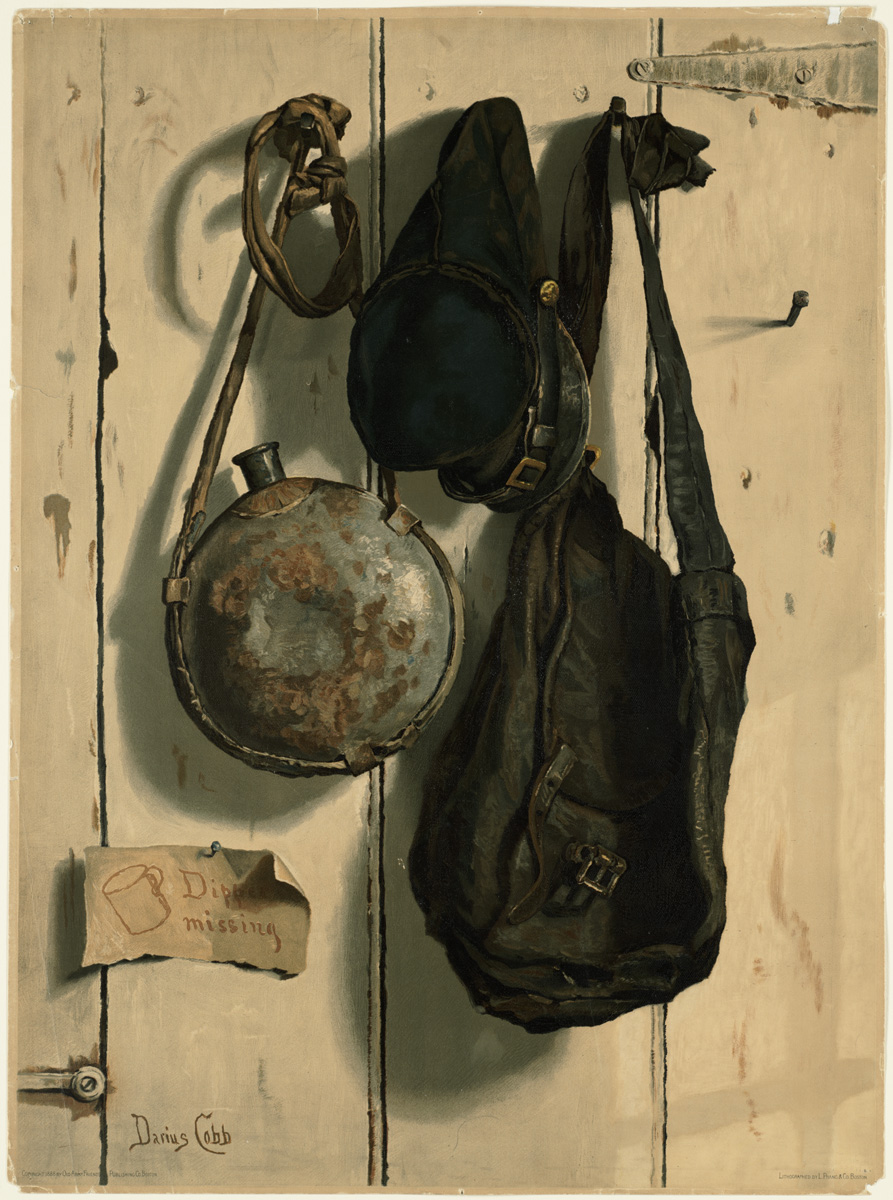
Darius Cobb (1834–1919), an American Civil War trompe-l'œil composition, here in a chromolithograph print

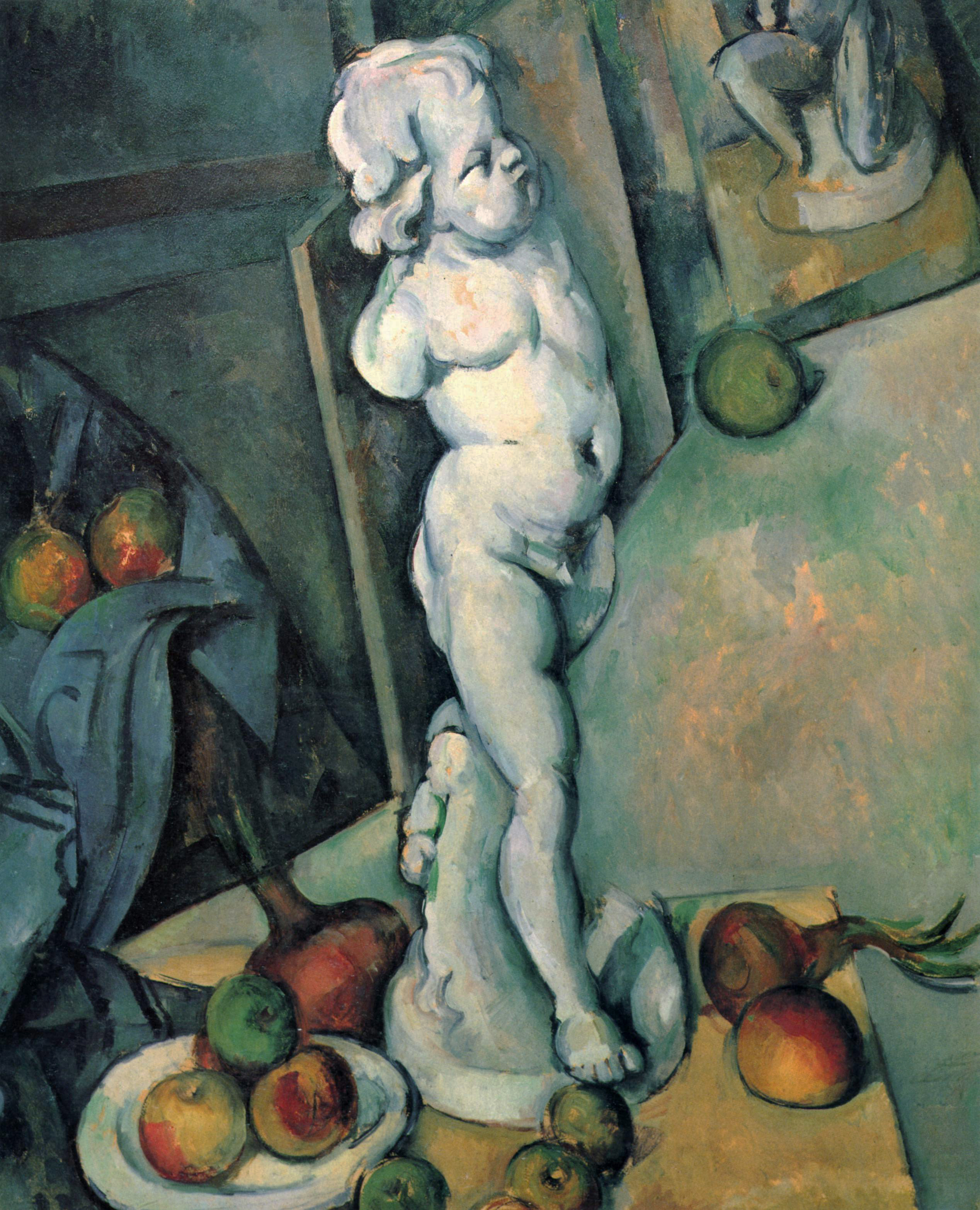
Paul Cézanne, Still Life with Cherub (1895), Courtauld Institute Galleries, London

== Twentieth century ==
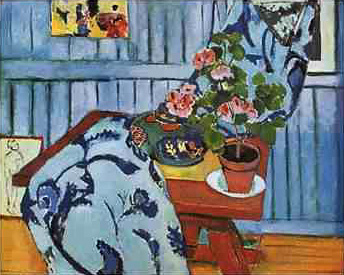
Henri Matisse, Still Life with Geraniums (1910), Pinakothek der Moderne, Munich, Germany

Jean Metzinger, Fruit and a Jug on a Table (1916), oil and sand on canvas, 115.9 x 81 cm, Museum of Fine Arts, Boston

The first four decades of the 20th century formed an exceptional artistic ferment and revolution period. Avant-garde movements rapidly evolved and overlapped in a march towards nonfigurative, total abstraction. The still life and other representational art continued to evolve and adjust until mid-century, when total abstraction, as exemplified by Jackson Pollock's drip paintings, eliminated all recognizable content.

The century began with several trends taking hold in art. In 1901, Paul Gauguin painted Still Life with Sunflowers, his homage to his friend Van Gogh who had died eleven years earlier. The group known as Les Nabis, including Pierre Bonnard and Édouard Vuillard, took up Gauguin's harmonic theories and added elements inspired by Japanese woodcuts to their still-life paintings. French artist Odilon Redon also painted notable still life during this period, especially flowers.

Henri Matisse reduced the rendering of still-life objects even further to little more than bold, flat outlines filled with bright colours. He also simplified perspective and introduced multi-colour backgrounds. In some of his still-life paintings, such as Still Life with Eggplants, his table of objects is nearly lost amidst the other colourful patterns filling the rest of the room. Other exponents of Fauvism, such as Maurice de Vlaminck and André Derain, further explored pure colour and abstraction in their still life.

Paul Cézanne found in still life the perfect vehicle for his revolutionary explorations in geometric spatial organization. For Cézanne, still life was a primary means of taking painting away from an illustrative or mimetic function to one demonstrating independently the elements of colour, form, and line, a major step towards Abstract art. Additionally, Cézanne's experiments can be seen as leading directly to the development of Cubist still life in the early 20th century.

Adapting Cézanne's shifting of planes and axes, the Cubists subdued the colour palette of the Fauves and focused instead on deconstructing objects into pure geometrical forms and planes. Between 1910 and 1920, Cubist artists like Pablo Picasso, Georges Braque, and Juan Gris painted many still-life compositions, often including musical instruments, bringing still life to the forefront of artistic innovation, almost for the first time. Still life was also the subject matter in the first Synthetic Cubist collage works, such as Picasso's oval "Still Life with Chair Caning" (1912). In these works, still-life objects overlap and intermingle, barely maintaining identifiable two-dimensional forms, losing individual surface texture, and merging into the background—achieving goals nearly opposite to those of traditional still life. Fernand Léger's still life introduced the use of abundant white space and coloured, sharply defined, overlapping geometrical shapes to produce a more mechanical effect.

Rejecting the flattening of space by Cubists, Marcel Duchamp and other members of the Dada movement, went in a radically different direction, creating 3-D "ready-made" still-life sculptures. As part of restoring some symbolic meaning to still life, the Futurists and the Surrealists placed recognizable still-life objects in their dreamscapes. In Joan Miró's still-life paintings, objects appear weightless and float in lightly suggested two-dimensional space, and even mountains are drawn as simple lines. In Italy during this time, Giorgio Morandi was the foremost still-life painter, exploring a wide variety of approaches to depicting everyday bottles and kitchen implements. Dutch artist M. C. Escher, best known for his detailed yet ambiguous graphics, created Still life and Street (1937), his updated version of the traditional Dutch table still life. In England Eliot Hodgkin was using tempera for his highly detailed still-life paintings.

When 20th-century American artists became aware of European Modernism, they began to interpret still-life subjects with a combination of American realism and Cubist-derived abstraction. Typical of the American still-life works of this period are the paintings of Georgia O'Keeffe, Stuart Davis, and Marsden Hartley, and the photographs of Edward Weston. O'Keeffe's ultra-closeup flower paintings reveal both the physical structure and the emotional subtext of petals and leaves in an unprecedented manner.

In Mexico, starting in the 1930s, Frida Kahlo and other artists created their own brand of Surrealism, featuring native foods and cultural motifs in their still-life paintings.

Starting in the 1930s, abstract expressionism severely reduced still life to raw depictions of form and colour, until by the 1950s, total abstraction dominated the art world. However, pop art in the 1960s and 1970s reversed the trend and created a new form of still life. Much pop art (such as Andy Warhol's "Campbell's Soup Cans") is based on still life, but its true subject is most often the commodified image of the commercial product represented rather than the physical still-life object itself. Roy Lichtenstein's Still Life with Goldfish Bowl (1972) combines the pure colours of Matisse with the pop iconography of Warhol. Wayne Thiebaud's Lunch Table (1964) portrays not a single family's lunch but an assembly line of standardized American foods.

The Neo-dada movement, including Jasper Johns, returned to Duchamp's three-dimensional representation of everyday household objects to create their own brand of still-life work, as in Johns' Painted Bronze (1960) and Fool's House (1962). Avigdor Arikha, who began as an abstractionist, integrated the lessons of Piet Mondrian into his still lifes as into his other work; while reconnecting to old master traditions, he achieved a modernist formalism, working in one session and in natural light, through which the subject-matter often emerged in a surprising perspective.

A significant contribution to the development of still-life painting in the 20th century was made by Russian artists, among them Sergei Ocipov, Victor Teterin, Evgenia Antipova, Gevork Kotiantz, Sergei Zakharov, Taisia Afonina, Maya Kopitseva, and others.

By contrast, the rise of Photorealism in the 1970s reasserted illusionistic representation, while retaining some of Pop's message of the fusion of object, image, and commercial product. Typical in this regard are the paintings of Don Eddy and Ralph Goings.

=== Twentieth-century paintings ===
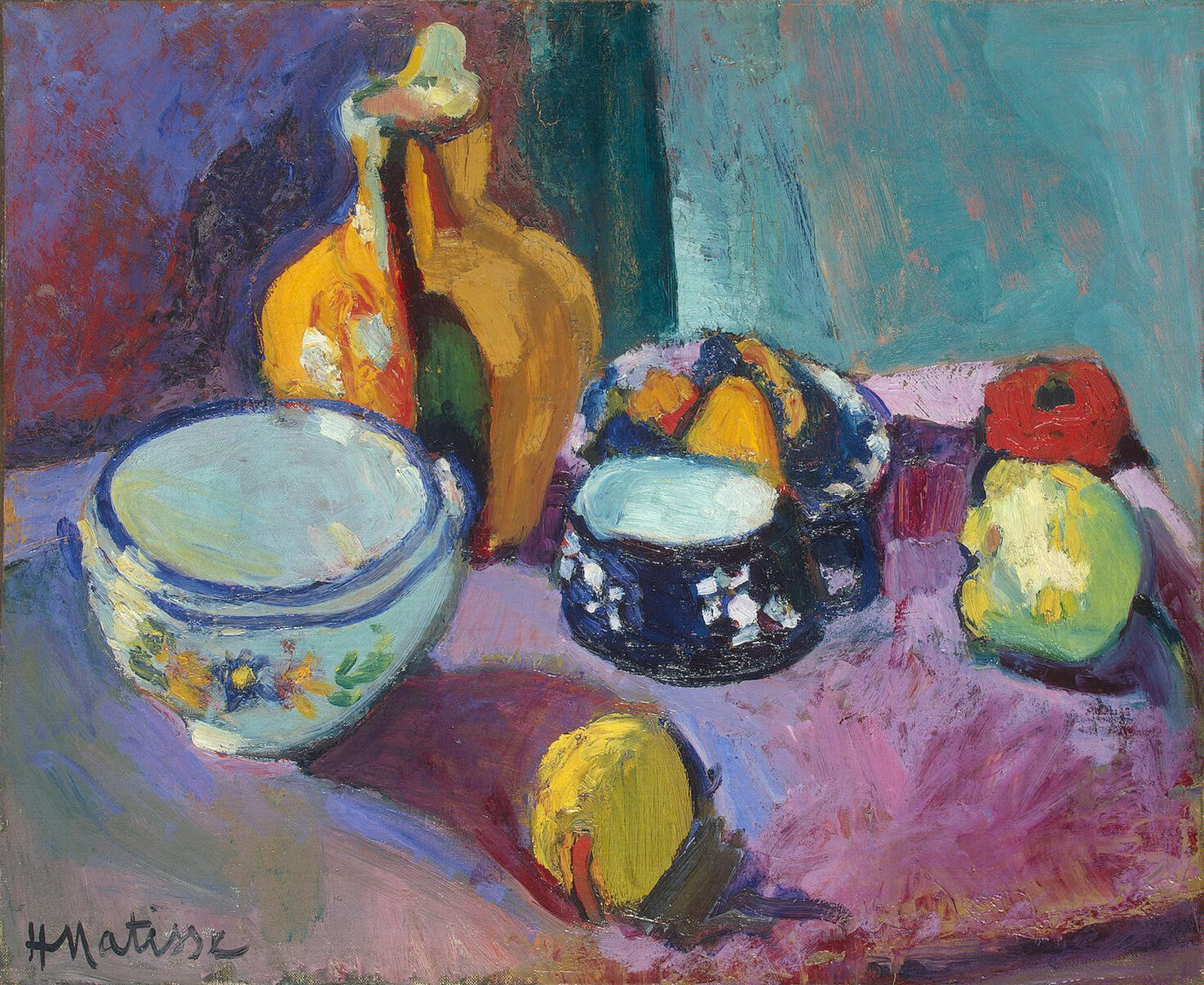
Henri Matisse (1869–1954), Dishes and Fruit (1901), Hermitage Museum, St. Petersburg, Russia

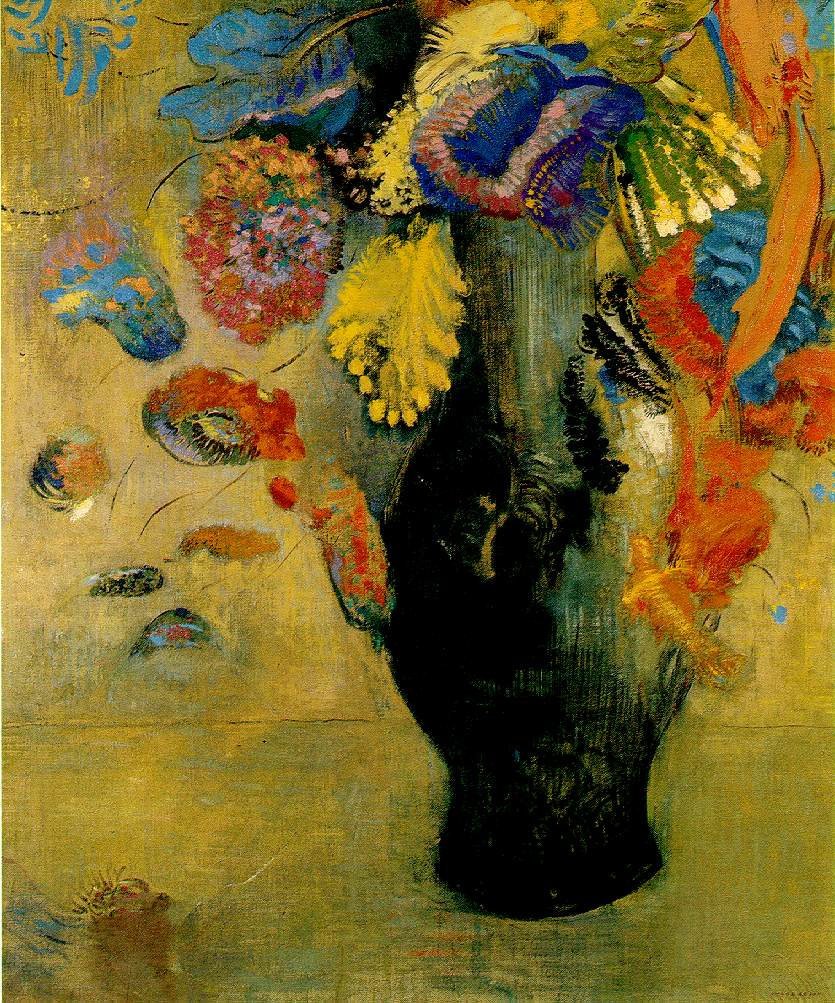
Odilon Redon (1840–1916), Flowers (1903)

Georges Braque (1882–1963), Violin and Candlestick (1910), San Francisco Museum of Modern Art

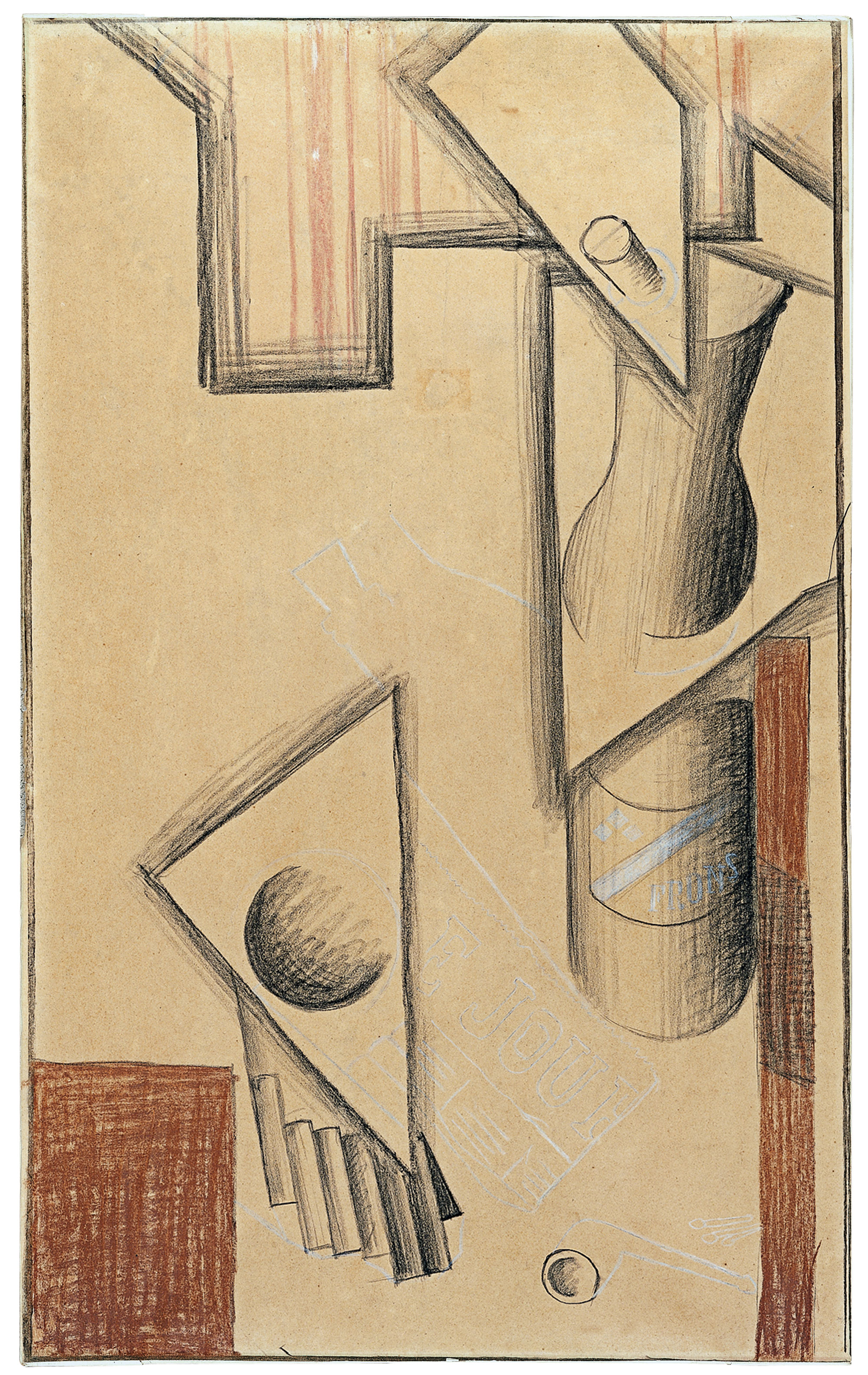
Juan Gris (1887–1927), Nature morte (1913), Museo Thyssen Bornemisza

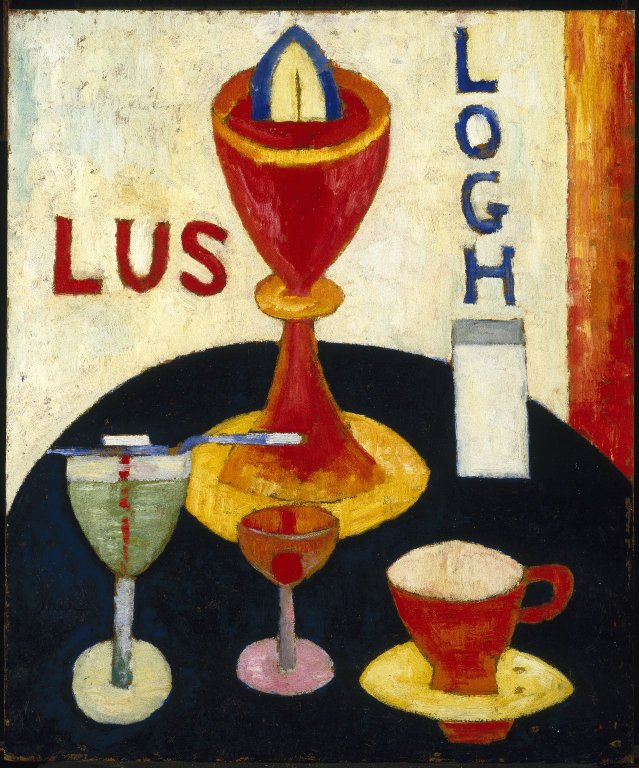
Marsden Hartley (1877–1943), Handsome Drinks (c. 1916), Brooklyn Museum

Fernand Léger (1881–1955), Still Life with a Beer Mug (1921), Tate

Pablo Picasso, Compotier avec fruits, violon et verre (1912)

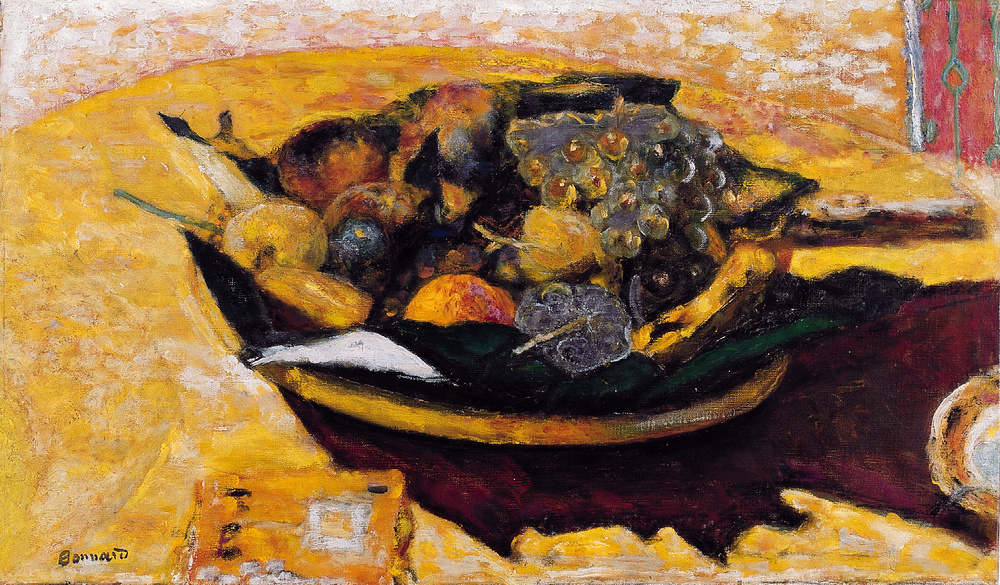
Pierre Bonnard (1867–1947), Fruit Bowl on a Table (c. 1934), MAMC Strasbourg

== 21st century ==
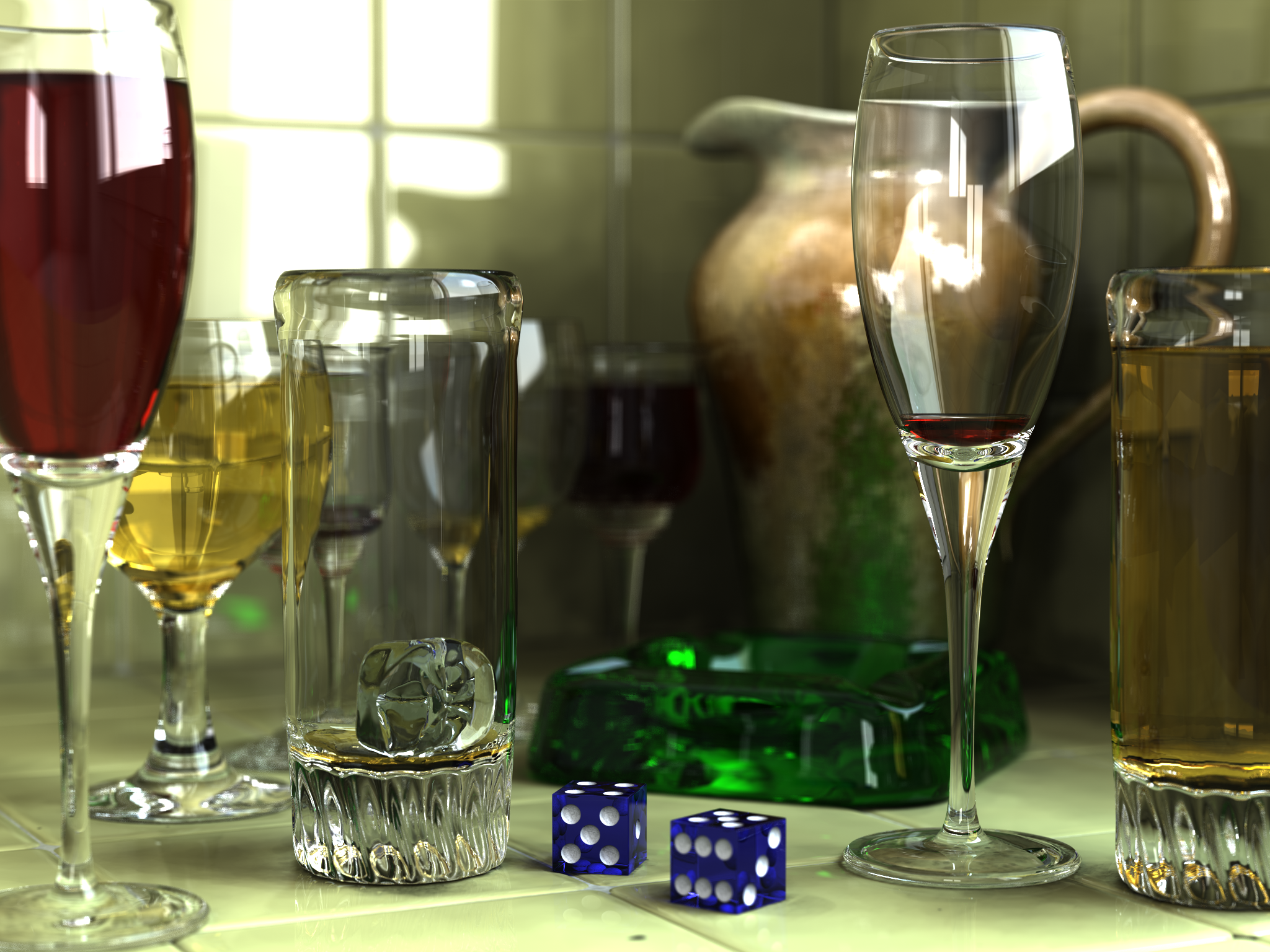
A completely synthetic, computer-generated still life, 2006 (by Gilles Tran)

During the 20th and 21st centuries, the notion of the still life has been extended beyond the traditional two-dimensional art forms of painting into video art and three-dimensional art forms such as sculpture, performance and installation. Some mixed media still-life works employ found objects, photography, video, and sound, and even spill out from ceiling to floor and fill an entire room in a gallery. Through video, still-life artists have incorporated the viewer into their work. Following from the computer age with computer art and digital art, the notion of the still life has also included digital technology. Computer-generated graphics have potentially increased the techniques available to still-life artists. 3D computer graphics and 2D computer graphics with 3D photorealistic effects are used to generate synthetic still life images. For example, graphic art software includes filters that can be applied to 2D vector graphics or 2D raster graphics on transparent layers. Visual artists have copied or visualised 3D effects to manually render photorealistic effects without the use of filters.

== See also ==
- Vanitas
- Memento Mori
- Still life photography
