= GIS (disambiguation) =

GIS (Geographic information system) is a computer-based system to analyse and present spatial data.

GIS or Gis may also refer to:

== Business ==
- General Mills, an American food manufacturer, NYSE symbol
- Madhya Pradesh Global Investors' Summit, Indore, India
- Green investment scheme
- Grey Island Systems International, a Canadian company
- Gunawan Iron and Steel, Indonesia

== Government ==
- Georgian Intelligence Service
- General Intelligence Service (Egypt)
- General Intelligence Service (Palestine)
- General Intelligence Service (Sudan)
- Ghana Immigration Service
- Gruppo di intervento speciale, Italian Carabinieri unit
- Government Information Services, Hong Kong
- Guaranteed Income Supplement, to Canadian pension
- Integrated Security Unit (French: Groupe intégré de la sécurité), in Canada
- Special Intervention Group (French: Groupe d'Intervention Spécial), of Algeria

== Language ==
- Giš, a cuneiform sign
  - GIŠ (wood Sumerogram), a cuneiform determinative prefix for wooden items
- North Giziga language

== Places ==
- Gis, Iran
- Greenland ice sheet

== Schools ==
- Garden International School, in Kuala Lumpur, Malaysia
- German International School Doha, in Qatar
- Gippsland Independent Schools, in Victoria, Australia
- Goshen Intermediate School, in New York, US
- Grace International School, in Chiang Mai, Thailand
- Granada Islamic School, in Santa Clara, California, US
- Greenoak International School, in Port Harcourt, Rivers State, Nigeria
- Global Indian School, in Ajman, United Arab Emirates

== Science and technology ==
- Gas imaging spectrometer, on Japan's Advanced Satellite for Cosmology and Astrophysics
- Gas-insulated switchgear
- Generalized iterative scaling
- Global information system

== Other uses ==
- Cemetery GIS, Giza Plateau, Egypt
- G♯ (musical note), German notation Gis
- Gadigal Information Service, which runs Koori Radio in Sydney, Australia
- Gateshead International Stadium, in Tyne and Wear, England
- Gisborne Airport, in New Zealand
- Gis Gelati, an Italian cycling team
- Partenope Napoli Basket, an Italian basketball team sponsored as Gis Napoli 1977–1978
- Guide International Service, of the UK Girl Guides Association

== See also ==
- GI (disambiguation)
- Jizz (disambiguation)
