= Church Park Historic District =

Historic district in New York, United States

- U.S. National Register of Historic Places
- U.S. Historic district
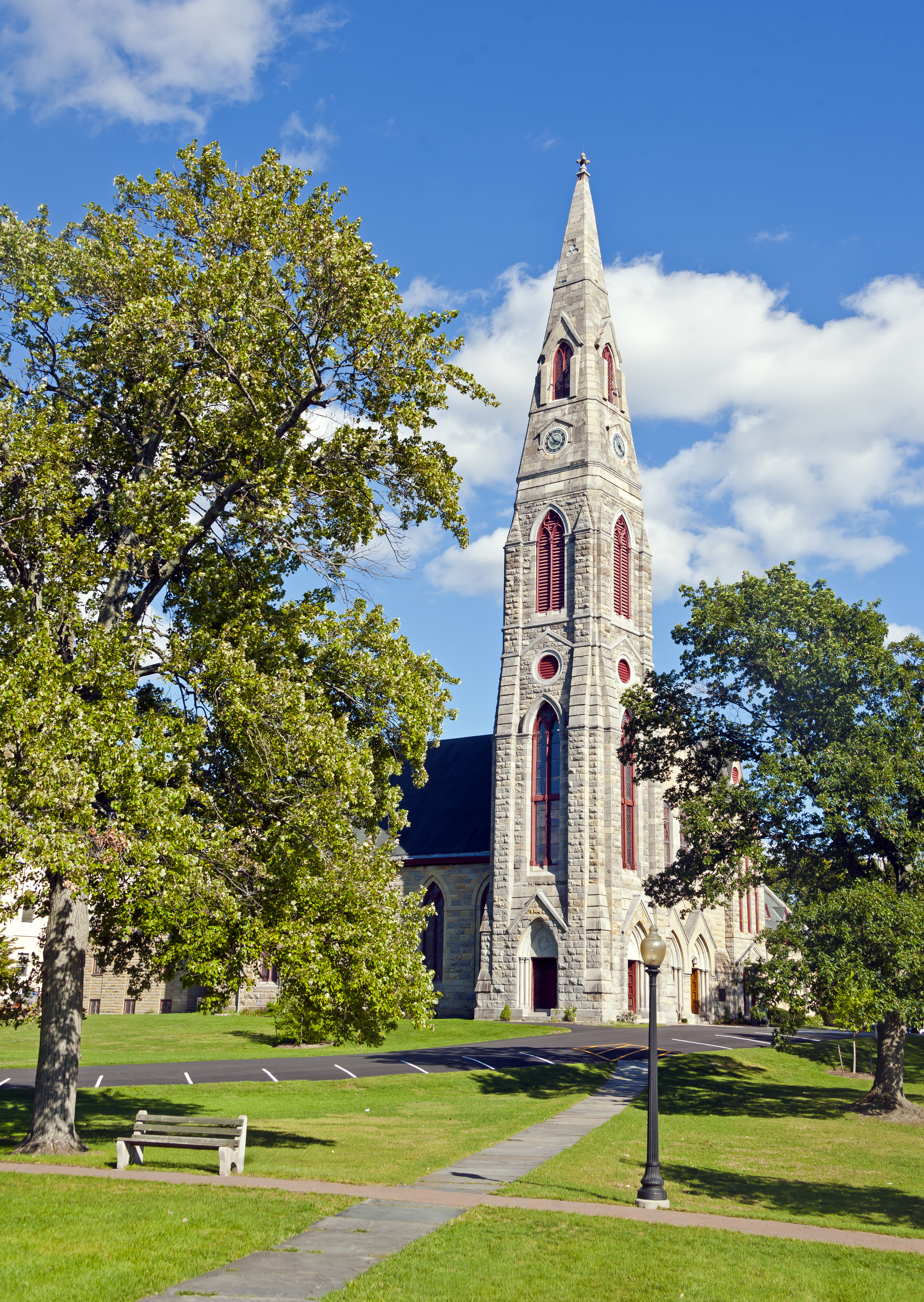
- First Presbyterian Church and park, 2015

- Location within New York Location within the United States
- Location: Goshen, NY
- Nearest city: Middletown
- Coordinates: 41°24′07″N 74°19′22″W
- Area: 1,020 acres (410 ha)
- Built: 18th-20th century
- Architect: Thornton Niven, Richard Upjohn, Calvert Vaux and N. Van Sickle
- Architectural style: Federal style, Greek Revival, Gothic Revival
- NRHP reference No.: 80002735 (original); 04000991 (increase)

Significant dates
- Added to NRHP: November 17, 1980
- Boundary increase: September 15, 2004

The Church Park Historic District is a historic district and part of downtown Goshen, the seat of Orange County, New York, United States. It takes its name from the large triangular park formed at the center of the village by Main Street (NY 207), Park Place and South Church Street. It is defined as bounded by Green Street on the south, Main Street, Webster Avenue, and then back across Main at Erie Street across the Historic Track to Kelsey Lane, South Church Street, South Street and back to Green. There are 107 buildings and three objects within the district.

At the north end of the triangle are First Presbyterian Church, whose distinctive spire dominates the village's skyline, giving the district its name. It was first designated when added to the National Register of Historic Places in 1980 as bounded by Park, Main and Webster. In 2004 it was expanded to its current boundaries.

The village designated the area an Architectural Design District a few years after the district was added to the Register. This provides for review of design elements for any new construction within its boundaries to ensure that they conform to its historic character, which stands as a stark contrast to the brutalist, Paul Rudolph-designed Orange County Government Center to the north of the district. Most of the properties within are either churches, county government buildings or professional offices, with residential uses taking up the side streets. There is some retail along the west side of Main Street near the southwestern corner of the district, where it abuts Goshen's main downtown shopping district.

== Significant contributing properties ==
The district's 1,020 acres (4 km^{2}) includes three contributing properties that are Registered Historic Places in their own right. Foremost among them is the Historic Track, a National Historic Landmark where harness racing has taken place since 1838, making it the oldest continuously operated horse racing facility in the U.S. In front of it, on Main Street near the north end of the district, is the Tudor Revival Harness Racing Museum & Hall of Fame. Facing the church from across Main is the county's 1841 courthouse, a magnificent Greek Revival structure designed by popular local architect Thornton Niven.

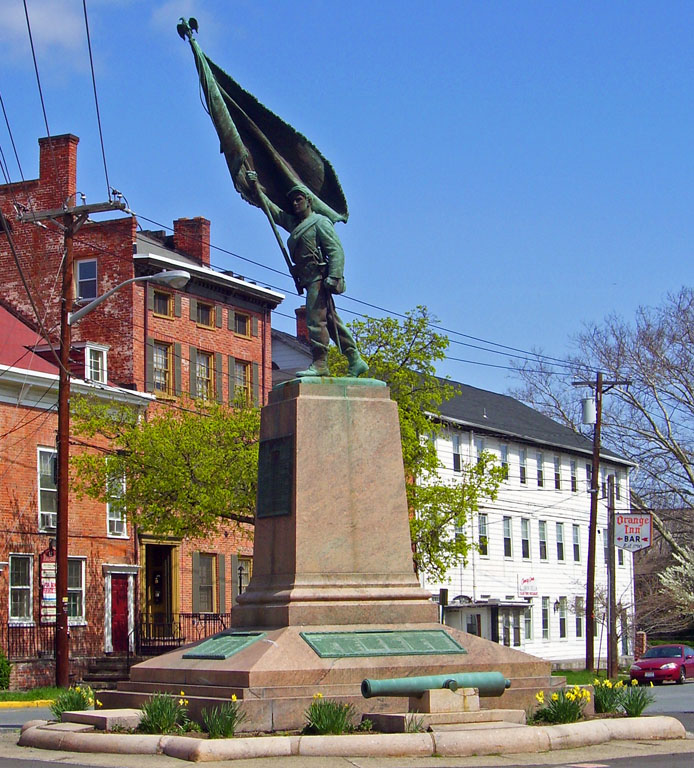
The Orange Blossoms monument

Just north of the church is Orange County's 1887 government building, and in the middle of the intersection of Main and Park is a Theo Alice Ruggles Kitson statue commemorating the "Orange Blossoms", a locally raised regiment that fought with distinction in the Civil War. The Goshen United Methodist Church, almost as tall as its neighbor, adjoins the old courthouse.

At the corner of Park and South Church, another monument remembers the village's sacrifice during the Revolutionary War. A granite obelisk marks the mass grave of the local militiamen who died in the disastrous Battle of Minisink. It took 43 years for locals to make the trip to the battle site and retrieve what bones they could.

Main Street to the north of the intersection is wide and lined with historic buildings on both sides. They include a house from which President Ulysses S. Grant watched the horse races in 1873 and the early 20th-century school building which now serves as main offices for the Goshen Central School District.

== See also ==
- National Register of Historic Places listings in Orange County, New York
