= United States Post Office (Goshen, New York) =

- U.S. Post Office
- U.S. National Register of Historic Places
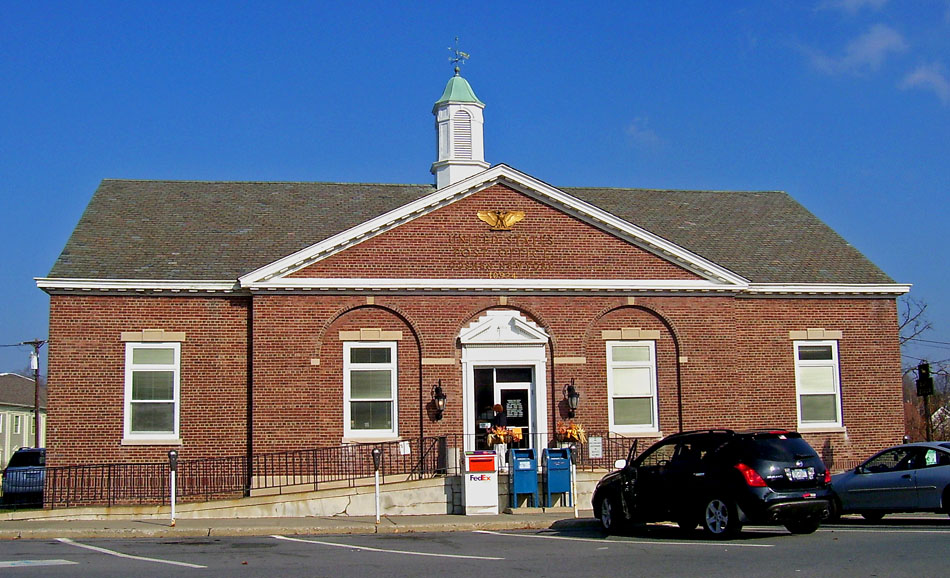
- Front (south) elevation, 2007

- Location within New York Location within the United States
- Interactive map showing the location for U.S. Post Office, Goshen
- Location: 20 Grand St. Goshen, New York
- Coordinates: 41.4024°N 74.3262°W
- Built: 1935–6
- Architect: E.P. Valkenburgh
- Architectural style: Colonial Revival
- MPS: US Post Offices in New York State, 1858-1943, TR
- NRHP reference No.: 88002527
- Added to NRHP: May 11, 1989

The U.S. Post Office in Goshen, New York, United States, is located on Grand Street downtown in the village of Goshen. It serves ZIP Code 10924, roughly contiguous with the village and town. The brick Colonial Revival building was completed in 1936, and added to the National Register of Historic Places in 1989.

E.P. Valkenburgh's design is smaller than most Colonial Revival post offices built during the New Deal in the state. It also features a high degree of decoration for a small post office in that style. The front lobby features a mural of Goshen's major landmark, the Historic Track, by Georgina Klitgaard, that was controversial when the post office was built.

== Building ==
The post office is a one-and-half-story, five-by-three-bay steel frame building that occupies most of the lot on the north side of Grand between Canal and Main streets. It is faced in Harvard-style brick laid in common bond. The foundation is done in molded brick except for a stonework area near the entrance.

A three-bay front pavilion, projected slightly, contains the entrance area, framed with engaged pilasters supporting a plain entablature and denticulated pediment with a cast iron eagle and "UNITED STATES POST OFFICE GOSHEN NEW YORK" in bronze letters on the tympanum. It is flanked by two windows with cast-stone trim and cast iron lanterns. The front windows are shallow-arched, with brick surrounds, keystones and spring blocks.

The steeply pitched gabled roof is tiled in slate and topped by an octagonal cupola with louvered openings, a copper dome and weather vane. The roofline is marked by a modillioned cornice with side returns.

Inside, the vestibule is finished in the original wood. It gives onto the lobby, with a terrazzo floor. The walls have vertical-planked wooden wainscoting topped by modillions. They rise to a coved ceiling with stepped panels.

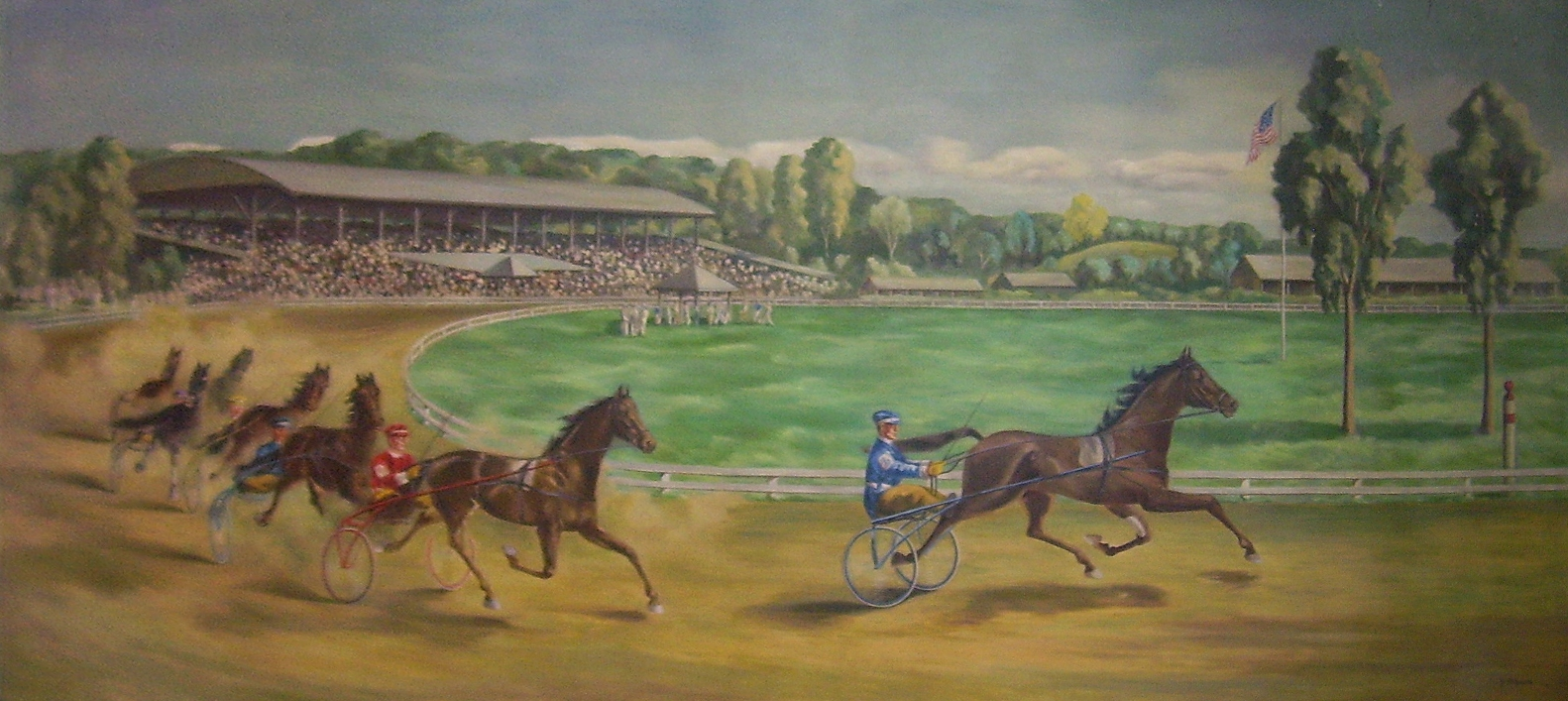
"The Running of the Hambletonian Stake", by Georgina Klitgaard

The original light fixtures has been replaced with fluorescent lights, but otherwise the customer service windows and teller bays are intact save where one of the latter has been replaced with bronze lockboxes. Klitgaard's 5'5" by 11' (1.7 by 3.4 m) mural, "The Running of the Hambletonian Stake", depicting a harness race at the nearby Historic Track, is just below the ceiling on the east wall.

== Aesthetics ==
Smaller than most other small Colonial Revival Depression-era post offices in New York, the Goshen design does not appear to have been duplicated elsewhere in New York as others were (such as Suffern's and Waverly's). Valkenburgh's other New York post office, in Catskill, another small Hudson Valley county seat, is distinctly different.

The building does, however, share with some other contemporary Colonial Revival post offices, such as Dobbs Ferry and Hudson Falls its fine detail. Those buildings, too, share steep gable roofs, ornamented ends and classically inspired entryways.

== History ==
Goshen's first post office was built shortly after the Revolution. Over the years it was operated from several different buildings in the village. The current building was one of many authorized by Congress in a 1931 amendment to the Public Buildings Act of 1926, when it expanded the scope of the program in response to rising unemployment at the start of the Depression. Funds were not appropriated until 1934.

The site chosen, across from what was then the Erie Railroad station (now the headquarters of the village police department), had been vacant since the St. Elmo Hotel (built 1887) burned down in 1920. In November 1934 it was condemned by the Treasury Department, the Post Office's then-parent agency. Samuel Plato was awarded the $85,000 ($2,000,000 in contemporary dollars) contract and construction of the new building was completed in early 1936.

Klitgaard's mural was added the following year. Postal murals of the era were supposed to focus on local history and contemporary life, but the Treasury Department's Fine Arts Section strongly objected to her intention to paint the track, since it considered harness racing to be an inappropriate subject for public art, asking her to paint a local landscape instead. The community indicated its strong support of the track, and she was allowed to paint it.

There have been few modifications to the building since then, primarily in the rear portions of the interior. In 1978, a wheelchair access ramp was built on the front.
