= Scotchtown Avenue Elementary School =

Coordinates: 41.4143°N 74.3245°W

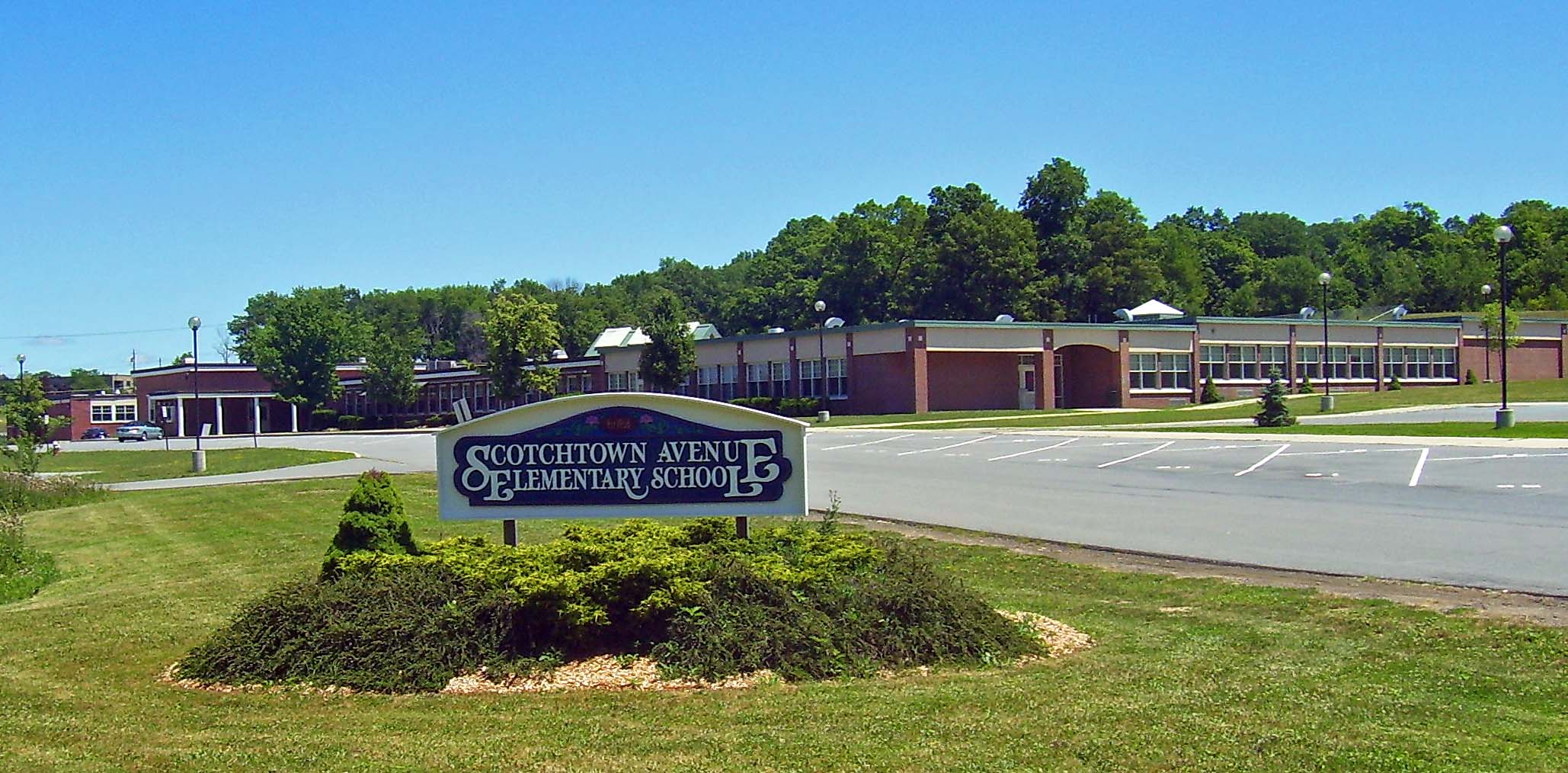
- School in 2007
- Goshen, NY; United States

Information
- Type: public
- Established: 1956
- School district: Goshen Central School District
- Principal: Kristin Driscoll
- Faculty: 55
- Grades: K-2
- Enrollment: 670
- Campus size: 38 acres (15 ha)
- Campus type: Suburban
- Website: https://www.gcsny.org/scotchtown-avenue-elementary-school/

Scotchtown Avenue Elementary School (often locally referred to just as Scotchtown Elementary School or SAS) educates students in kindergarten through second grade in the Goshen Central School District, which covers the village and most of the town of Goshen in Orange County, New York, United States. It is located on Scotchtown Avenue (Orange County 83) in the northwest corner of the village, next to the district's bus garage and in front of Goshen Central High School.

In 2000, a 28,000-square foot (2,520 m²) addition was built on to the original 1956 building at a cost of $5.4 million. It added four new kindergarten classrooms, extended both wings of the building and converted its existing library into a cafeteria, among other changes. Some of the existing space was leased by the district to Orange-Ulster BOCES for its STRIVE program for autistic children.
