= Goshen Intermediate School =

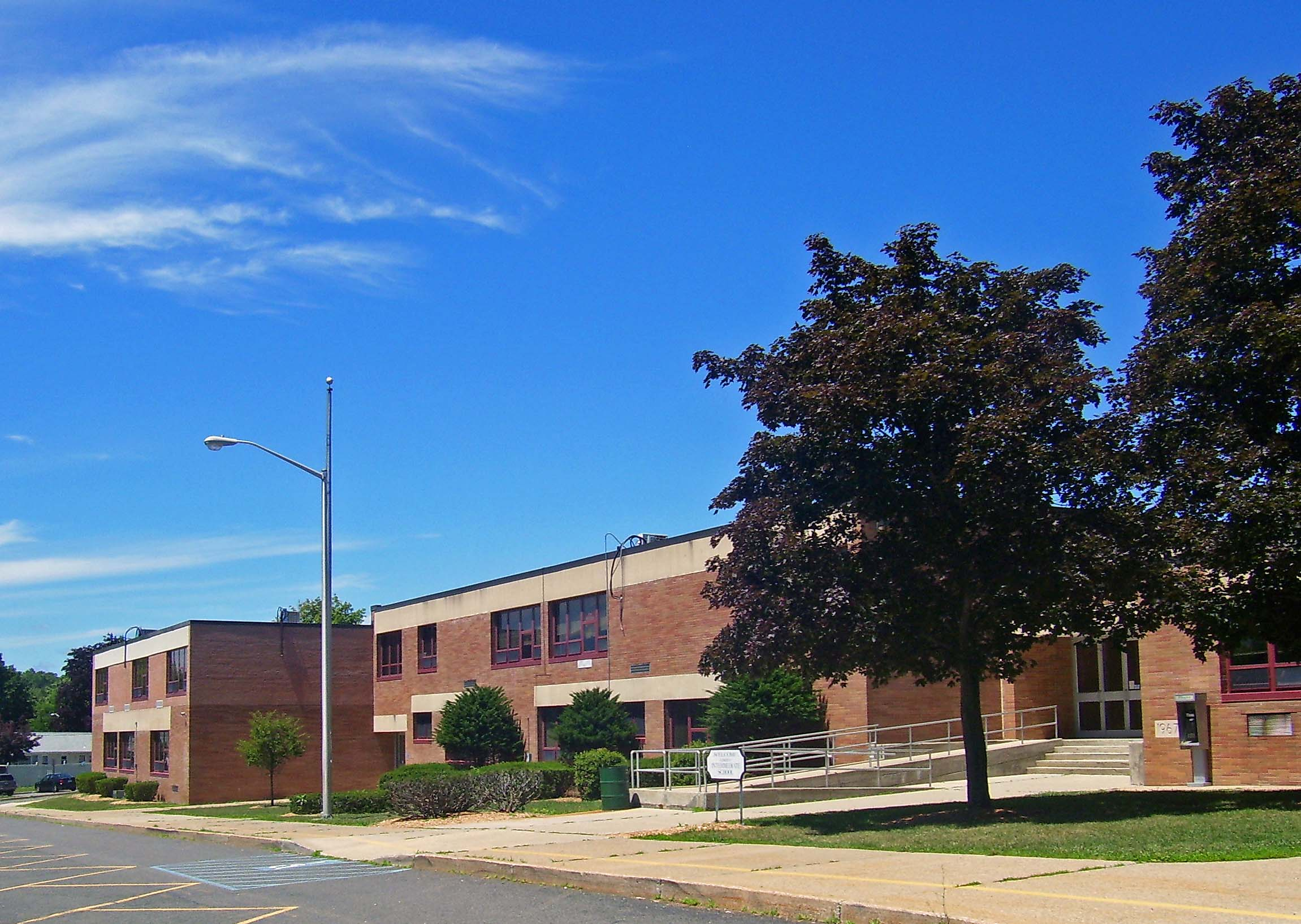
- School in 2007

Location
- Goshen, New York; United States
- Coordinates: 41°24′42″N 74°19′12″W

Information
- Type: public
- Established: 1967
- School district: Goshen Central School District
- Principal: Dr. Matthew Wentworth
- Faculty: 45
- Grades: 3-5
- Enrollment: 606
- Campus type: Suburban
- Colors: Red, white and blue
- Website: www.gcsny.org/goshen-intermediate-school/

Goshen Intermediate School (also known as G.I.S.) educates students in grades 3-5 in the Goshen Central School District, covering the eponymous village and town in Orange County, New York, United States. It is located on McNally Street in the village, not far from the other Goshen schools.

The building was constructed in 1967. It is the newest building in the district after the high school. For the first nine years of its existence, prior to the construction of the high school, it was used as the district's middle school.

In 2007 the school's then principal, Mary Ann Knight, caused a small controversy when she forbade a group of fourth-graders from singing an anti-war song they had written as a project for chorus class after a parent complained. While the lyrics did not mention any specific conflict, parents and school officials that it might be seen as expressing opposition to the Iraq War, and they did not want the controversy overshadowing the school's spring concert.
