= Thornton M. Niven =

Hon. Thornton Niven
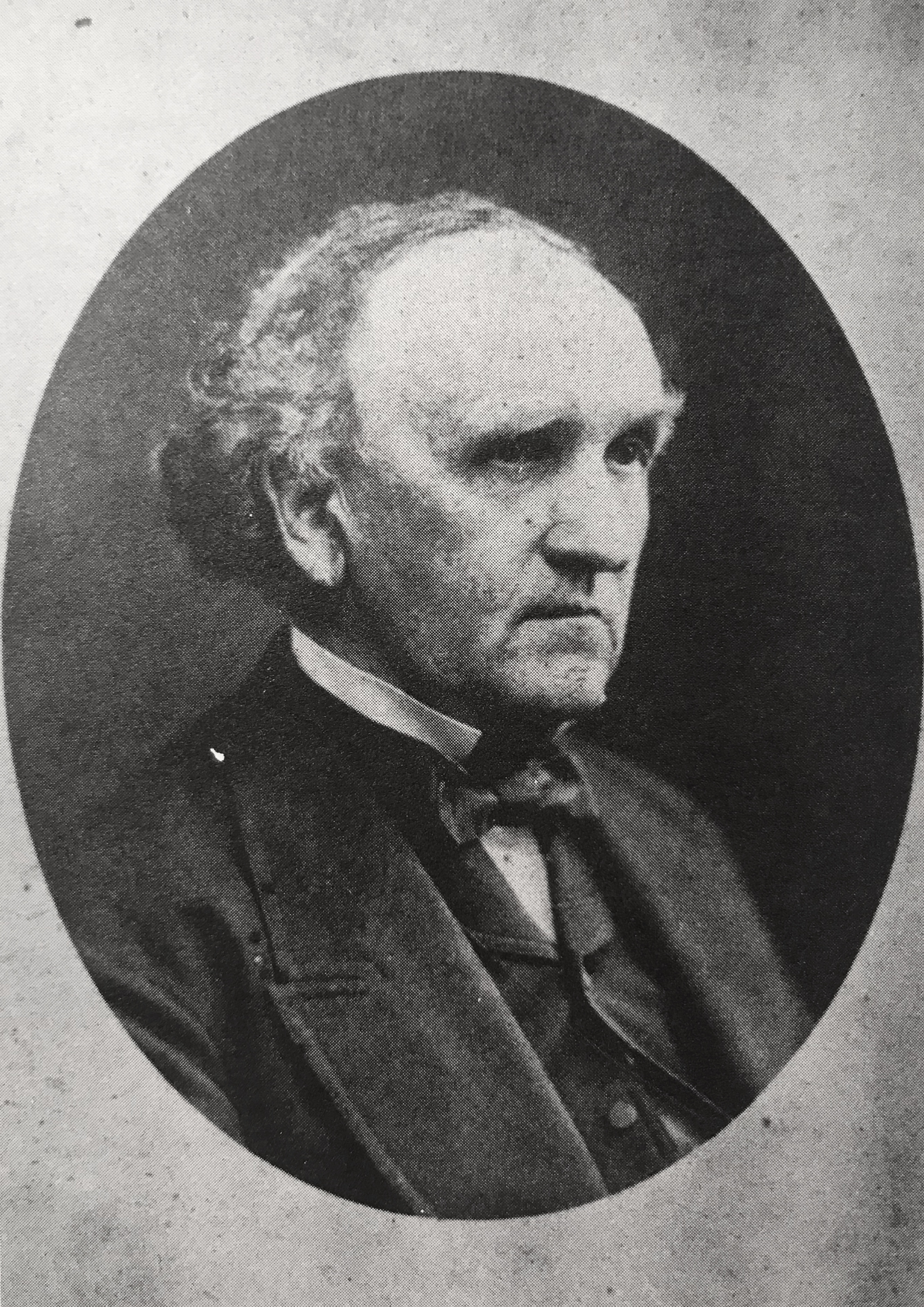
- Niven in 1872
- Born: Thornton MacNess Niven; February 3, 1806; Newburgh, New York, US
- Died: January 17, 1895 (aged 87); Hackensack, New Jersey, US
- Resting place: Bloomingburg, New York
- Occupation(s): Architect, stonecutter, politician
- Years active: 1825—1860
- Known for: Goshen Courthouse; Newburgh Courthouse; Brooklyn Navy Yard Dry Dock 1
- Style: Greek Revival, Gothic Revival, Italianate
- Spouse: Letita Mills (m. 1826)
- Relatives: Thornton Wilder

Thornton MacNess Niven (1806 – 1895) was a Scottish-American architect and master stonecutter who worked primarily in Newburgh, New York, but also in several locations along the Hudson River and Southern United States. Although Niven considered himself more of a stonecutter than an architect, he acquainted himself with several men working to establish Gothic Revival and Italianate styles within American architectural practice—Andrew Jackson Downing, Alexander Jackson Davis, James H. Dakin, Russell Warren, and Calvin Pollard. In his early career as a granite stonecutter, Niven gained national acclaim.

== Works ==
=== Known ===
- Dutch Reformed Church, Newburgh, New York (Stonework, 1835)
- Theological Seminary of the Associate Reformed Synod of New York, Newburgh, New York (1837-1838)
- Second Associated Reformed (Union) Church, Newburgh, New York (1837-1838, demolished)
- Thornton Niven House, Newburgh, New York (1838-1839)
- William C. Hasbrouck House, Newburgh, New York (1838-1839)
- Orange County Courthouse, Goshen, New York (1841-1842)
- Orange County Courthouse, Newburgh, New York (1841-1842)
- Dr. John D. Lockwood House, New Castle, Delaware (1843)
- Sullivan County Courthouse, Monticello, New York (1844-1845, demolished)
- Dry Dock 1, Brooklyn Navy Yard, Brooklyn, New York (Stonework, supplied beach gravel,1846-1851)
- Suffolk County Courthouse and Jail, Riverhead, New York, (1854-1855, burned 1927)

=== Speculated ===
- James River Dam (Bosher's Dam), near Richmond, Virginia (Supplied granite, 1830, demolished)
- Monticello Presbyterian Church, Monticello, New York (1844, burned 1943)
- Monticello Academy, Monticello, New York, (1850-1852, demolished)
- Orange County Clerk's Office (1851, demolished)
- Mobile Customs House, Mobile, Alabama (Supplied granite, 1852-1854, demolished)
