= Steve Cushing =

American football coach (born c. 1997)

Current position
- Title: Head coach
- Team: Misericordia
- Conference: MAC
- Record: 7–4

Biographical details
- Born: c. 1997 (age 28–29); Florida, New York, U.S.
- Education: Misericordia University (2018)

Playing career
- 2015–2018: Misericordia
- Position: Safety

Coaching career (HC unless noted)
- 2019 (spring): Goshen Central HS (NY) (STC/RB/LB)
- 2019–2020: Wilkes (S)
- 2021: Cortland (LB)
- 2022–2024: Cortland (DC/LB)
- 2025–present: Misericordia

Head coaching record
- Overall: 7–4
- Bowls: 0–1

Stephen Cushing (born c. 1997) is an American college football coach. He is the head football coach for Misericordia University, a position he has held since 2025. He also coached for Goshen Central High School, Wilkes, and Cortland, where he won the 2023 Stagg Bowl as the team's defensive coordinator. He played college football for Misericordia as a safety.

== Playing career and education ==
Cushing grew up in Florida, New York, and attended John S. Burke Catholic High School , where he was a four-year member of both the football and baseball teams, serving as a captain for both.

Cushing attended Misericordia University and was a four-year member of the football team as a safety. In his senior season, he helped lead the team to its first postseason appearance in program history.

Cushing graduated from Cushing in 2018 with a degree in business.

== Coaching career ==
Cushing began his career in 2019 as the special teams coordinator, running backs coach, and linebackers coach for Goshen Central High School. He spent a few months with the school before being hired as the safeties coach for Wilkes.

In 2021, Cushing was hired as the linebackers coach for Cortland. After only one season, he was promoted to defensive coordinator. In 2023, he helped lead the team to a win in the 2023 Stagg Bowl. In early 2025, Cortland head coach Curt Fitzpatrick resigned to become the head coach for Colgate, leaving Cushing to be promoted to interim head coach.

In 2025, after four seasons with Cortland, Cushing was hired as the head football coach for his alma mater, Misericordia. He took over for Tyler Cottle, who served as the interim head coach for the 2024 season, which ended in a 3–7 record.

Upon accepting the position, Cushing said:

Coaching football is my passion, and my mission as a coach is to develop young men into grown men. It is a tremendous honor to return to my alma mater as the head football coach. Misericordia molded me into the person I am today, and I am grateful to the campus community for the opportunities I was provided. I grew through the values of mercy, service, justice, and hospitality, and continue to lean on them daily."

Cushing began his tenure with a 2–1 record through three games, where he credited the team's culture for its early-season success.

== Head coaching record ==
Year	Team	Overall	Conference	Standing	Bowl/playoffs
Misericordia Cougars (Middle Atlantic Conference) (2025–present)
2025	Misericordia	7–4	7–2	T–2nd	L Centennial-MAC
2026	Misericordia	0–0	0–0		
Misericordia:		7–4	7–2		
Total:		7–4			
