= 1841 Goshen Courthouse =

- U.S. National Register of Historic Places
- U.S. Historic district – Contributing property
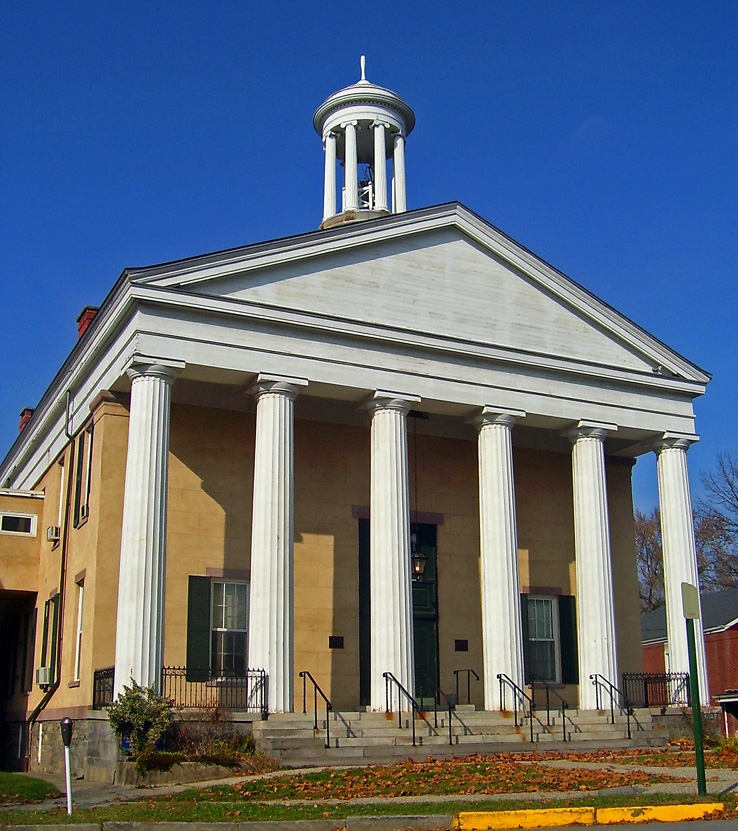
- The courthouse from across the street

- Location within New York Location within the United States
- Location: 101 Main St., Goshen, New York
- Nearest city: Middletown
- Coordinates: 41°24′09″N 74°19′20″W
- Area: 1 acre (0.40 ha)
- Built: 1841
- Architect: Thornton M. Niven
- Architectural style: Greek Revival
- NRHP reference No.: 75001219
- Added to NRHP: March 4, 1975

The 1841 Goshen Courthouse is located along Main Street (NY 207) in the center of Goshen, New York, the seat of Orange County, New York, United States. It was designed by popular local architect Thornton M. Niven in a Greek Revival style, meant to be a twin of the one he had already built in Newburgh, which at that time shared seat duties with the larger city. Construction of the building was approved by the county legislature in April 1841 and began shortly thereafter.

During construction of the building, the remains of American Revolutionary War Loyalist guerrilla leader Claudius Smith were rumored to have been found on the site and his skull embedded in the masonry above the front door. A plaque commemorating his hanging in Goshen and the associated tradition was dedicated at the site in 2016.

It was used as a courthouse until 1970, when the recently constructed Orange County Government Center made more space available. It was individually listed on the National Register of Historic Places in 1975. It is also a contributing property to the Church Park Historic District.

As of 2007, an annex to the courthouse houses offices of the Orange County Department of Consumer Affairs and other offices. In 2011, after the Orange County Government Center was damaged by Hurricane Irene, three Supreme Court judges relocated their cases to the courthouse. In 2015, county officials announced a $2.9 million plan to improve insulation and handicap accessibility over the course of approximately a year.

== See also ==
- National Register of Historic Places listings in Orange County, New York
