= Goshen Central School District =

School district in New York, United States

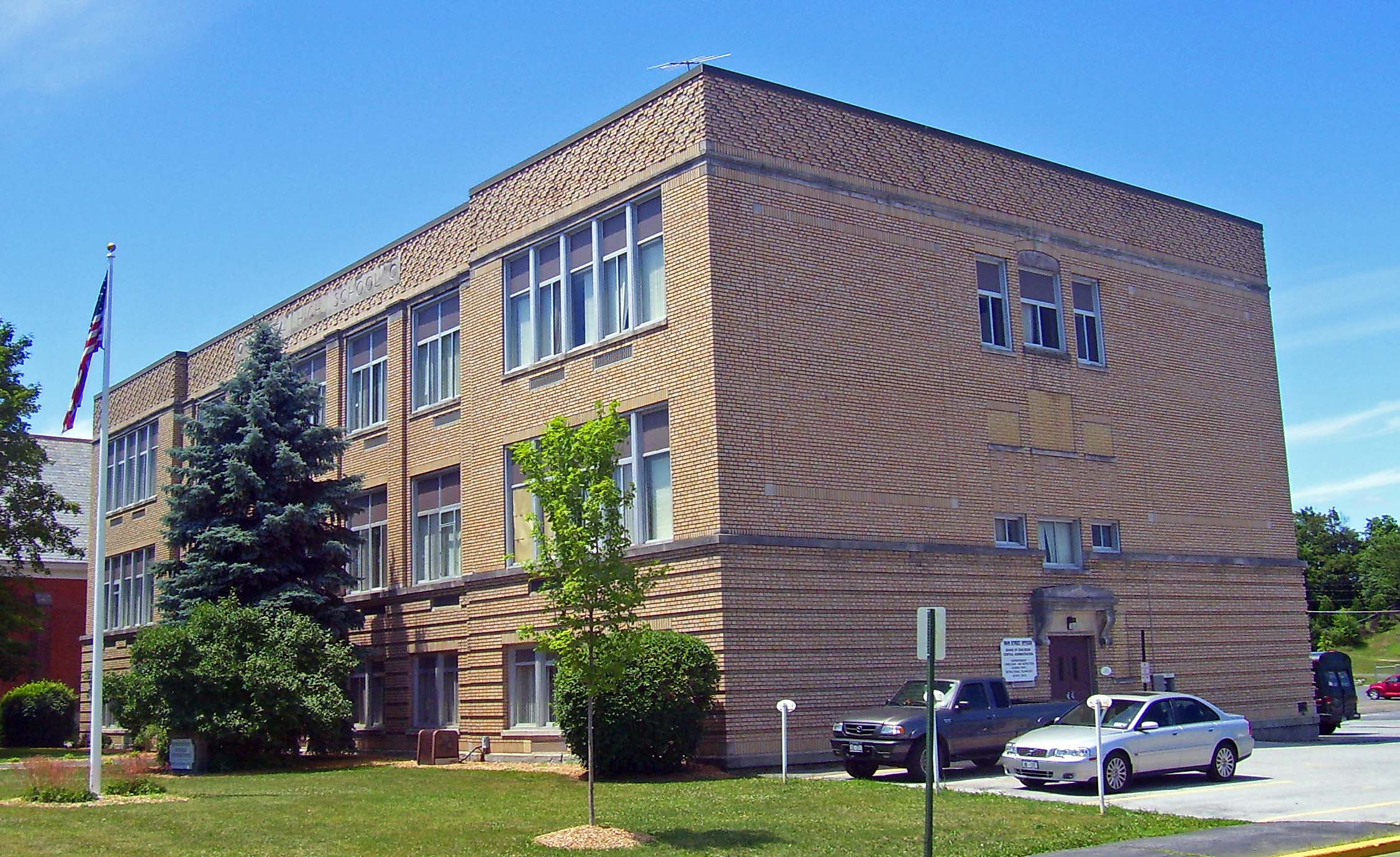
- The central administration building

Location
- Goshen, NY United States

District information
- Type: Central
- Grades: K-12
- Established: 1937
- Superintendent: Dr. Kurtis M. Kotes
- Budget: $55.2 million

Students and staff
- Students: 3,868
- Teachers: 221
- Staff: 28
- Athletic conference: Orange County Interscholastic Athletic Association
- Colors: Red and blue

Other information
- Website: https://www.gcsny.org/

The Goshen Central School District is a public school district in Orange County, New York, United States. It educates children in the village of Goshen and most of the town, as well as the Campbell Hall section of the neighboring Town of Hamptonburgh and part of the Town of Wallkill, including the hamlet of Michigan Corners. Established in 1937, it operates four schools, all located a short distance apart in the northwest corner of the village, and covering kindergarten through twelfth grade.

== History ==
It was first established in 1937 through the combination of smaller school districts in the Goshen area. It uses the original high school building at the corner of Main (NY 207) and Erie streets, just across from the Harness Racing Museum & Hall of Fame and next to the Orange County Government Center, as its main office.

== Schools ==
The district is organized so that each school handles the district's entire student population at their grade level.

- Scotchtown Avenue Elementary School: Kindergarten-2
- Goshen Intermediate School: Grades 3-5
- C. J. Hooker Middle School: Grades 6-8
- Goshen Central High School: Grades 9-12
