= Senator Heard =

Senator Heard may refer to:

- Dallas Heard (born 1985), Oregon State Senate
- Fred W. Heard (1940–2023), Oregon State Senate
- Isaac V. D. Heard (1834–1913), Minnesota State Senate
- John T. Heard (1840–1927), Missouri State Senate
- William Henry Heard (1850–1937), South Carolina State Senate
- William Wright Heard (1853–1926), Louisiana State Senate
