= Grey Island Systems International =

Software company in Canada

- Company type: Public (TSX-V: GIS])
- Industry: GPS/AVL & Telematics Information Systems
- Founded: 1998
- Defunct: 2009
- Headquarters: Toronto, Ontario, Canada
- Area served: North America
- Subsidiaries: InterFleet and NextBus
- Website: www.greyisland.com

Grey Island Systems International (TSX-V: GIS) was a provider of 'real-time' Internet-based GPS/AVL and passenger information solutions targeted to government and enterprise fleets. Its InterFleet and NextBus brands were independently launched commercially in 1998. It was acquired by[WebTech Wireless Inc. in 2009.

Headquartered in Toronto, with over 55 employees in offices around North America, Grey Island has garnered recognition from Industry groups such as the Profit 100, Canada’s Fastest Growing Companies (2005–2007) and Deloitte and Touche Technology Fast 50 (2006–2008).

== InterFleet ==
InterFleet was launched commercially in 1998 with an EMS (Emergency Medical Services) client, tracking ambulances every 100 meters of vehicle travel. This translated into the industry leading vehicle average update rate of 6 to 10 reports per minute. InterFleet’s patented live screen map thus displays the entire fleet and automatically refreshes updated status changes every second. Its applications have primarily been focused on public sector fleet tracking, and most of its users are state/provincial and local governments.

The InterFleet on-board GPS/AVL hardware and firmware as well as the middleware and end-user software is typically customized for each clients particular needs. It provides a broad variety of machine-to-machine and sensor integrations, allowing for application development to be focused on specific fleet management operation concerns, i.e. fuel costs, winter maintenance operations, government regulations, etc.

== NextBus ==
NextBus Logo

NextBus uses Global Positioning System (GPS) tracking satellites and advanced computer modeling to track vehicles in their routes, thus providing accurate vehicle arrival information and real-time maps instead of bus schedules to passengers and managers of public transit, shuttles, and trains. The information is updated at regular intervals to account for traffic variations, breakdowns, and day-to-day problems faced by transit providers that can interrupt service.

In addition, NextBus provides transit riders access to the information over the internet, via wireless devices such as PDAs and cell phones, through IVR (interactive voice response), and at electronic signs at specific bus stops.

== Senior management team ==
- Andrew Moore, Chief Executive Officer and Co-founder
- Owen Moore, President and Co-Founder
- Brian Boychuk, Executive Vice-President, Business Development and Marketing and Co-founder
- Chris Madden, Chief Financial Officer
- Alban Hoxha, Vice-President Software
- Jerry Dellacorte, Vice-President, InterFleet, Inc.
- Saleem Ahmed, Vice-President, Manufacturing
- Lillian Chan, Chief Operating Officer, NextBus, Inc.
- John Eaton, Chief Financial Officer, NextBus, Inc

== See also ==
- NextBus
- InterFleet
