= Georgina Klitgaard =

American painter (1893–1977)

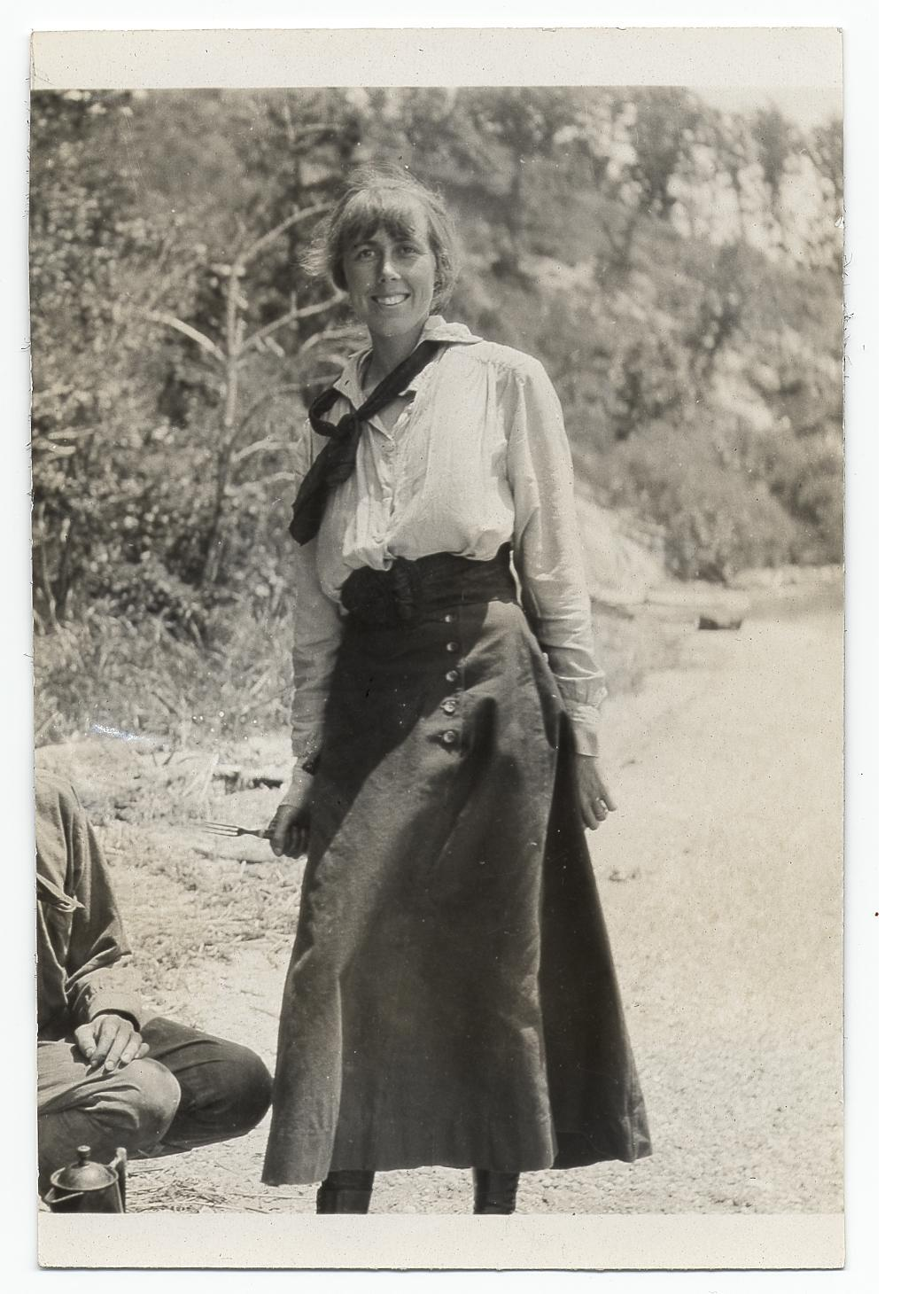
Georgina Klitgaard c. 1920

Georgina Klitgaard (née Berrian; July 3, 1893 – January 12, 1977) was an American artist. Klitgaard was known for panoramic landscape paintings of scenic New York from a bird's-eye view perspective. Her work was reviewed in the Los Angeles Times, on April 14, 1929, and in The Art Digest, on November 1, 1929. Her art work has been mentioned in numerous New York Times articles. The first exhibition she held was in New York at the Whitney Studio Club from December 20, 1927 to January 7, 1928. She was awarded a Guggenheim Fellowship in 1933, and her husband Kaj Klitgaard was awarded with a Guggenheim in 1937. She painted three murals in United States Post Offices during the Great Depression.

== Education ==
Born Spuyten Duyvil, New York (now The Bronx, New York) in 1893 as Georgina Berrian, she graduated from Barnard College. She also studied art at the National Academy of Design. She married Danish writer Kaj Klitgaard (1888-1954) in 1919. The couple had two sons: Peter Klitgaard (1921-1976) and Wallace Berrian Klitgaard (1937-2006). They lived in Bearsville, New York, near an artist colony in Woodstock, New York. She was among the List of Guggenheim Fellowships awarded in 1933.

Georgina Klitgaard died in Ulster County, New York on January 12, 1977, one month after the death of her elder son, Peter.

== Career ==
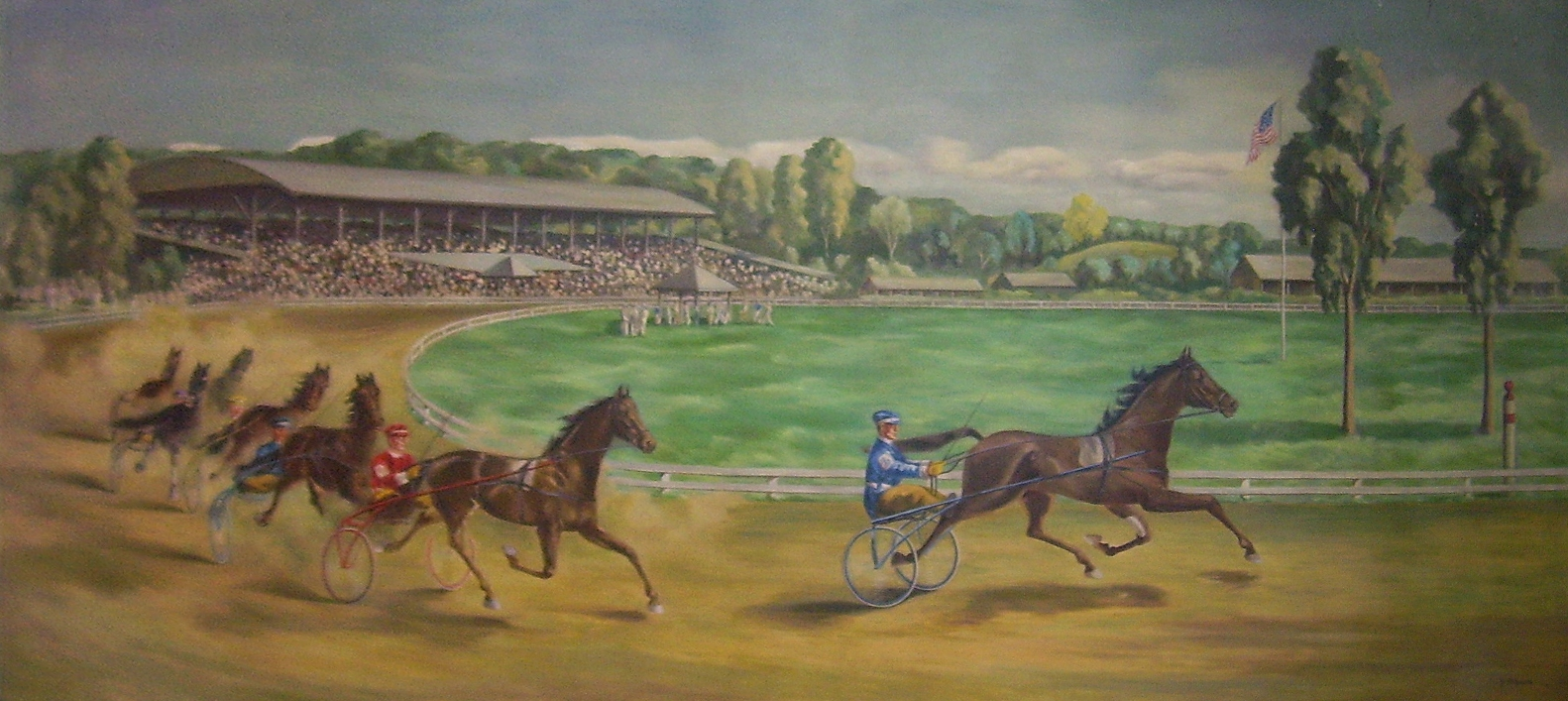
"The Running of the Hambletonian Stake" by Georgina Klitgaard at the United States Post Office (Goshen, New York)

She painted the New Deal era mural Pelham Landscape (1941) at the United States Post Office at Pelham, Georgia. Klitgaard's mural The Running of the Hambletonian Stake at the United States Post Office (Goshen, New York) (a property listed on the National Register of Historic Places) was controversial for featuring harness racing, a subject deemed unworthy for public art. Postal murals of the era were supposed to focus on local history and contemporary life, but the Treasury Department's Section of Painting and Sculpture strongly objected to her intention to paint the track, asking her to paint a local landscape instead. The community indicated its strong support of the track, and she was allowed to paint it. In January 1975 she became a member of the National Society of Literature and the Arts.
