= Misericordia Cougars football =

College football team

- First season: 2012
- Athletic director: Chuck Edkins
- Head coach: Steve Cushing; 1st season, 7–4 (.636)
- Location: Dallas, Pennsylvania
- Stadium: Mangelsdorf Field (capacity: 1,400)
- NCAA division: Division III
- Conference: MAC
- Colors: Blue and yellow
- All-time record: 24–76 (.240)
- Mascot: Cougars
- Website: athletics.misericordia.edu

The Misericordia Cougars football team represents Misericordia University in college football at the NCAA Division III level. The Cougars are members of the Middle Atlantic Conferences (MAC), fielding its team in the MAC since 2012. The Cougars play their home games at the Mangelsdorf Field in Dallas, Pennsylvania.

Their head coach is Steve Cushing, who took over the position for the 2025 season.

== Conference affiliations ==
- Middle Atlantic Conferences (2012–present)

== List of head coaches ==
=== Key ===
Key to symbols in coaches list
General		Overall		Conference		Postseason (Note: Although the first Rose Bowl Game was played in 1902, it has been continuously played since the 1916 game, and is recognized as the oldest bowl game by the NCAA. "—" indicates any season prior to 1916 when postseason games were not played.)	
No.	Order of coaches (Note: A running total of the number of head coaches, with coaches who served separate tenures being counted only once. Interim head coaches are represented with "Int" and are not counted in the running total. "—" indicates the team played but either without a coach or no coach is on record. "X" indicates an interim year without play.)	GC	Games coached	CW	Conference wins	PW	Postseason wins
DC	Division championships	OW	Overall wins	CL	Conference losses	PL	Postseason losses
CC	Conference championships	OL	Overall losses	CT	Conference ties	PT	Postseason ties
NC	National championships	OT	Overall ties (Note: Overtime rules in college football were introduced in 1996, making ties impossible in the period since.)	C%	Conference winning percentage		
†	Elected to the College Football Hall of Fame	O%	Overall winning percentage (Note: When computing the win–loss percentage, a tie counts as half a win and half a loss.)				

=== Coaches ===
List of head football coaches showing season(s) coached, overall records, conference records, postseason records, championships and selected awards
No.	Name	Season(s)	GC	OW	OL	OT	O%	CW	CL	CT	C%	PW	PL	PT	DC	CC	NC	Awards
1	Mark Ross	2012–2020	81	18	63	0	0.222	17	53	0	0.243	—	—	—	—	—	—	MAC Coach of the Year (2018)
2	John Davis	2021–present	19	6	13	0	0.316	5	12	0	0.294	0	0	0	0	0	0	—

== Year-by-year results ==
National champions	Conference champions	Bowl game berth	Playoff berth

Season	Year	Head coach	Association	Division	Conference	Record							Postseason	Final ranking
Season	Year	Head coach	Association	Division	Conference	Overall			Conference				Postseason	Final ranking
Season	Year	Head coach	Association	Division	Conference	Win	Loss	Tie	Finish	Win	Loss	Tie	Postseason	Final ranking
Misericordia Cougars
2012	2012	Mark Ross	NCAA	Division III	MAC	0	10	0	10th	0	9	0	—	—
2013	2013	Mark Ross	NCAA	Division III	MAC	1	9	0	9th	1	8	0	—	—
2014	2014	Mark Ross	NCAA	Division III	MAC	1	9	0	9th	1	8	0	—	—
2015	2015	Mark Ross	NCAA	Division III	MAC	1	9	0	10th	1	8	0	—	—
2016	2016	Mark Ross	NCAA	Division III	MAC	1	9	0	10th	1	8	0	—	—
2017	2017	Mark Ross	NCAA	Division III	MAC	1	9	0	9th	1	8	0	—	—
2018	2018	Mark Ross	NCAA	Division III	MAC	8	3	0	T–2nd	7	1	0	—	—
2019	2019	Mark Ross	NCAA	Division III	MAC	5	5	0	4th	5	3	0	—	—
No team due to COVID-19
2021	2021	John Davis	NCAA	Division III	MAC	3	6	0	9th	2	6	0	—	—
2022	2022	John Davis	NCAA	Division III	MAC	3	7	0	T–8th	3	6	0	—	—
2023	2023	John Davis	NCAA	Division III	MAC								—	—
2024	2024	Tyler Cottle	NCAA	Division III	MAC	3	7	0	8th	2	7	0	—	—
