= Coates-Goshen =

Defunct American motor vehicle manufacturer

The Coates-Goshen was an American automobile produced from 1908 until 1910 by Joseph Saunders Coates in Goshen, New York. The cars had four-cylinder engines of 25 hp and 32 hp. In 1910, larger 45 and 60 hp models were added. Production stopped when a fire broke out in the factory after about 30 cars had been made.

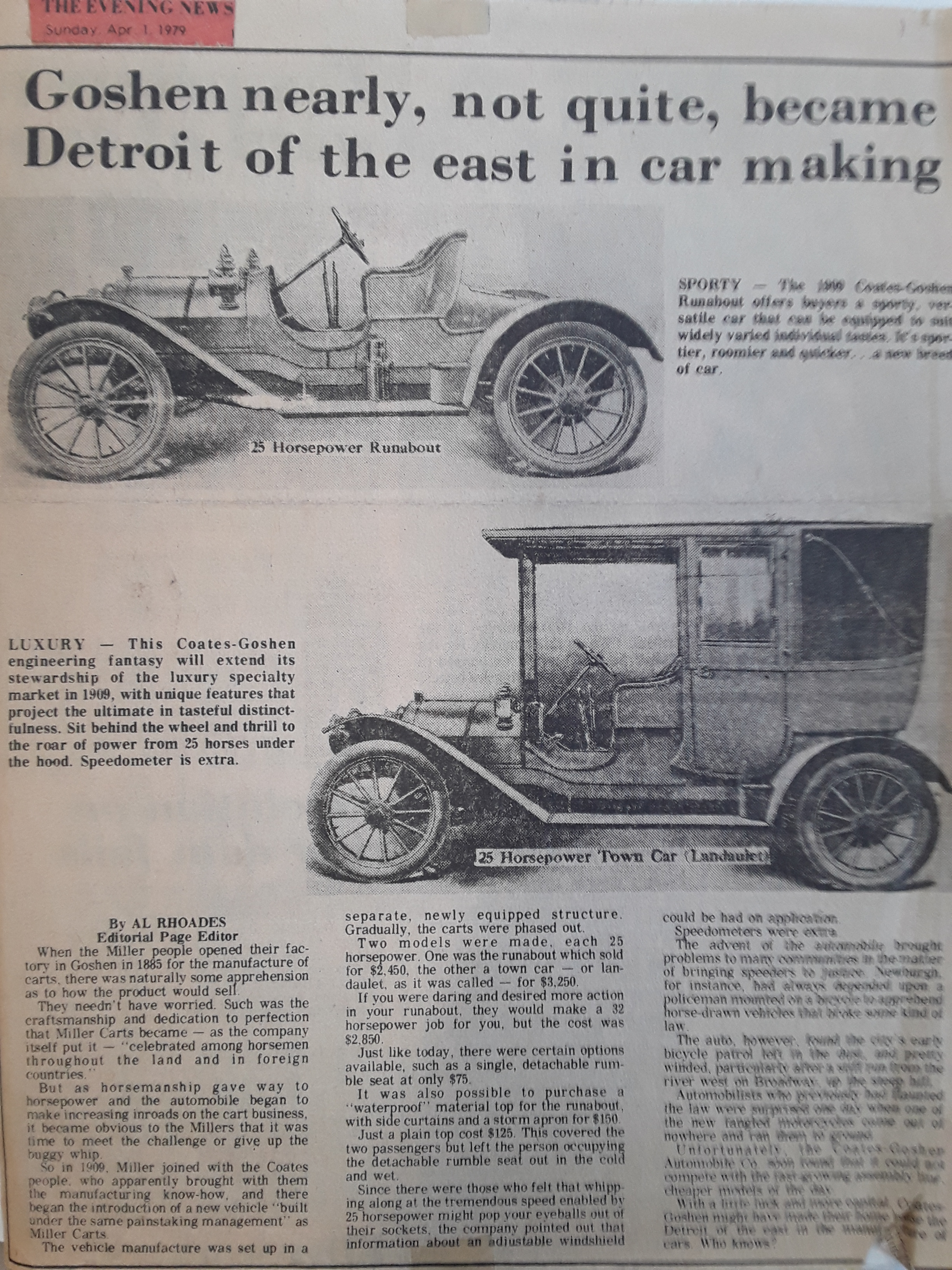
Coates-Goshen advertisement

The Coates-Goshen factory still stands, and was formerly Healey Brothers Chevrolet-Buick and now the corporate offices of Healey Brothers Inc. It retains its original look.

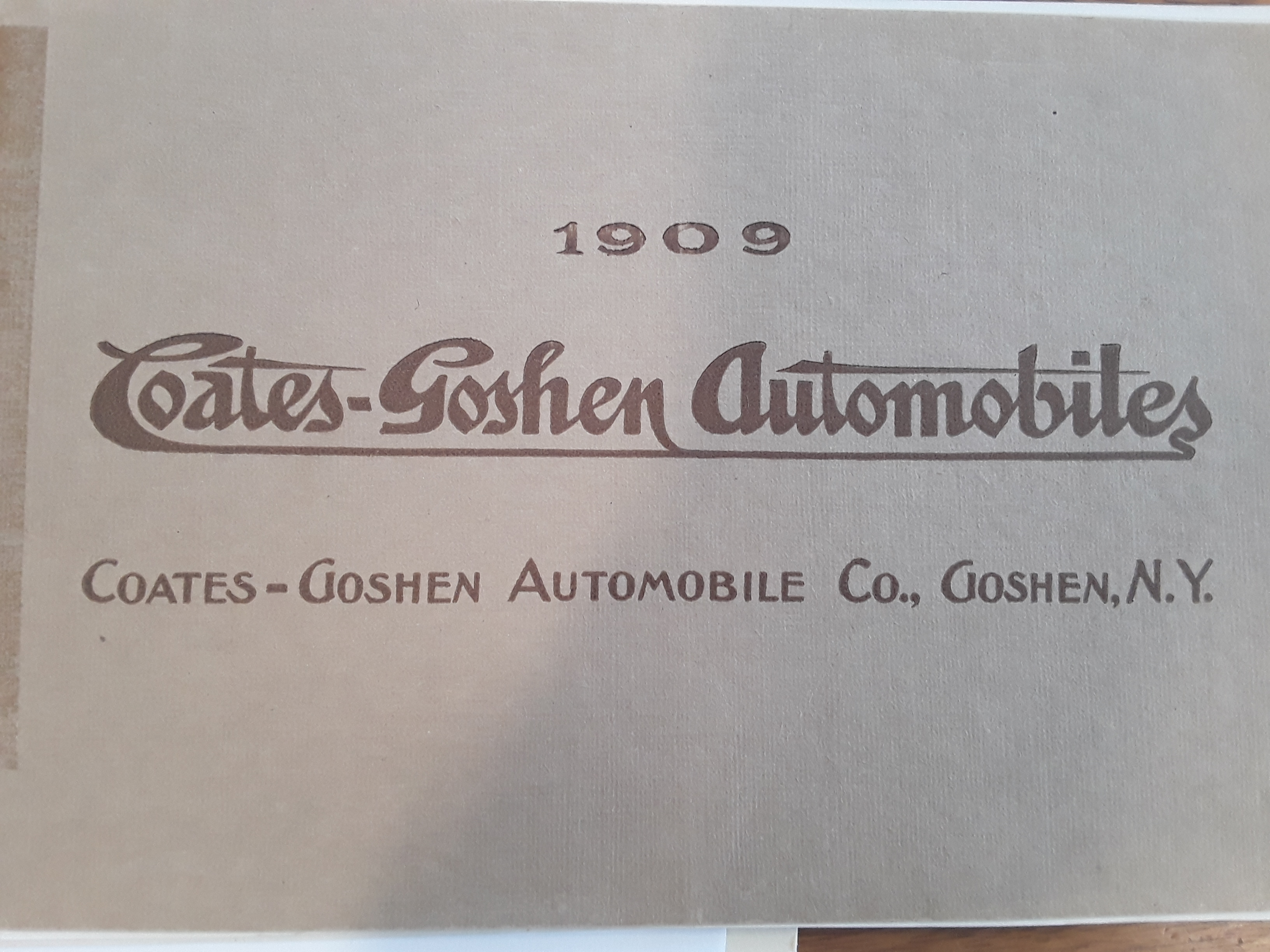
1909 Coates-Goshen parts manual
