= Thornton Niven House =

- U.S. Historic district – Contributing property
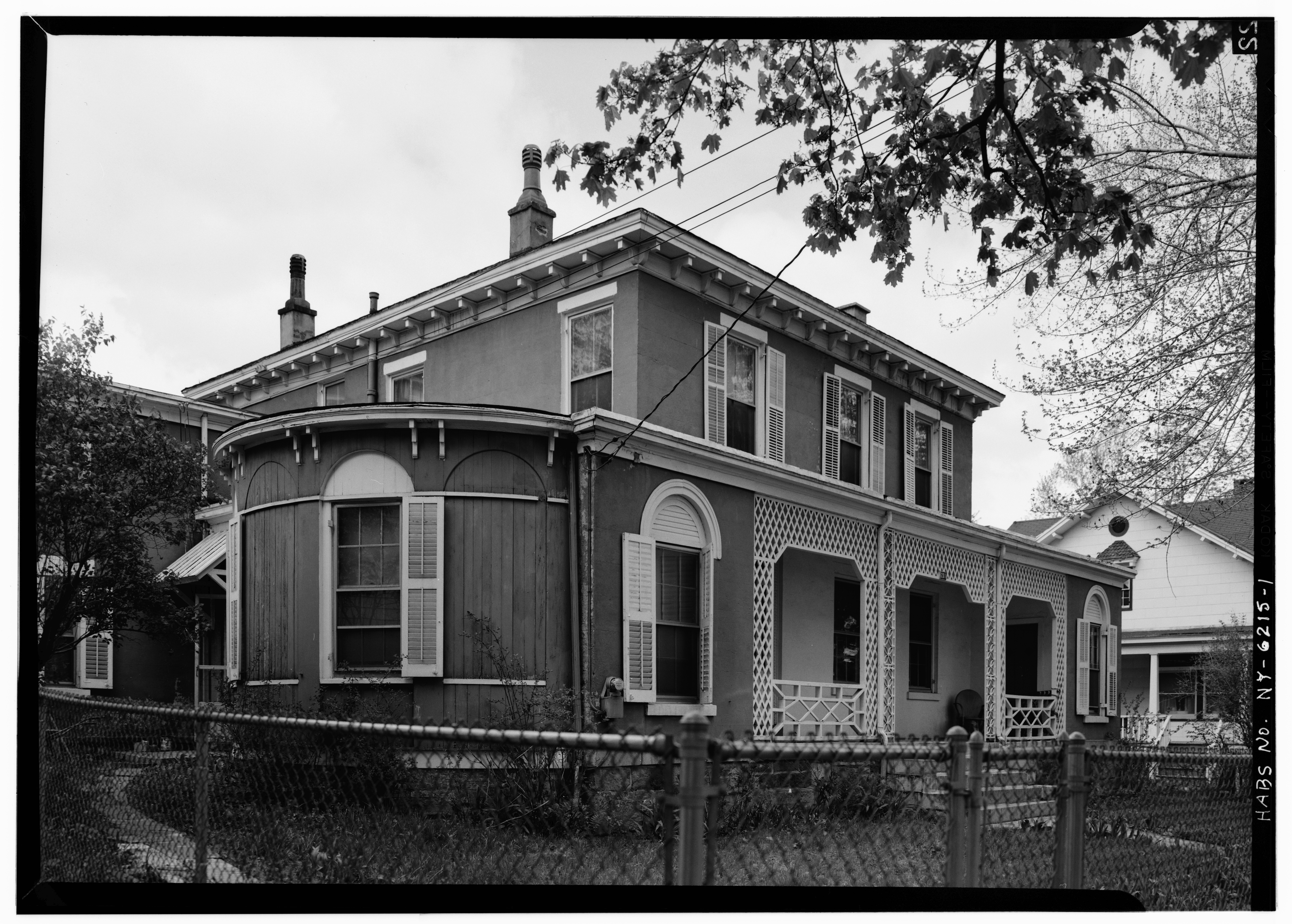
- The house in 1970
- Location: 201 Montgomery St., Newburgh, New York
- Built: 1839
- Architect: Thornton MacNess Niven
- Architectural style: Italianate
- Part of: Montgomery-Grand-Liberty Streets Historic District

Significant dates
- Added to NRHP: September 27, 1972
- Designated CP: July 16, 1973

The Thornton Niven House is a historic house in the city of Newburgh, New York, built by local stonecutter and mason Thornton MacNess Niven as his personal residence. After Niven and his family left Newburgh, the house was said to be the residence of architect Frederick Clarke Withers. It is considered to be one of the first examples of Italianate architecture in America.

== History ==
In the late 1820s, Niven occupied a house on Montgomery Street, formerly at the northeast corner of Fifth Street. This house, located in what was swiftly becoming a fashionable neighborhood for merchants and professionals, no longer stands. It is unknown exactly how long Niven stayed there, but it sold for $1400 on May 1, 1841 to James H. Leeds.

In 1842, Niven supplied the house's design to the publishers Gaylord & Tucker—his first publicly offered architectural service. It assured him at least one commission, and he called the design "Genteel Farm House". The small wing at the left side of the house appears larger, and with a detailed kitchen chimney. Niven's bracketed style of roof shown predates Downing's, but the latter architect received credit through his publication of Cottage Residences (1842) by a few months.

== Design ==
=== Italianate influence ===
The design of the house's exterior is similar to that of the Walsh-Havemeyer House in neighboring New Windsor, meaning the general square shape of both could be from Niven's imagination. The two have the same hipped roof shapes and corbels, are made of brick, and used distinctive stucco covering. The Walsh-Havemeyer House is considered a Greek Revival design for its Doric veranda, erected prior to A. J. Downing's criticism of the unfitting style. Niven turned from Greek Revival, which he had built his career upon, for the construction of his house. This uniqueness places an emphasis on his personal ties, and he selected more Italianate features: arched windows, a hipped roof, horizontal lines.

These choices make the house of the first Italianate villas in America, John Notman, a Philadelphia architect, being the first to experiment with the style in 1837. Downing is considered the first to publish an example of the Italianate villa in 1841. He could have been inspired by Niven's house, but both men could have seen the rapid growth of the style in New Haven.

Originally, the stucco had scores to resemble ashlar, and Niven inlaid the veranda with black and white marble tiles, which still exist.

=== Regency influence ===
An influence of the house was thought to be the American Regency Wickham House (1812) by Robert Mills in Richmond, Virginia, where Niven visited in the 1820s for a stonecutting project. Another Southern design ostensibly emulated is the Chisolm Plantation, The Launch (c. 1830), on Edisto Island, South Carolina. The rear elevation, seen from the water, bears a slight resemblance to the street-facing veranda of Niven's house.

=== Old English influence ===
The kitchen wing is derived from an Old English style of building appropriated in the 1830s, being slightly popularized by Notman. Downing drew from Notman's porch plans, which featured two low side projections such as the Chisolm Plantation's. Notman's design for the Nathan Dunn residence in Mount Holly, New Jersey contains a kitchen wing in the style Niven favored for his, used by Downing in A Treatise on the Theory and Practice of Landscape Gardening (1841). He noted that "In the Old English style these appendages are made to unite happily with the building..."
