= Isaac V. D. Heard =

American lawyer, soldier and politician

Isaac Van Duzer Heard (August 31, 1834 – June 17, 1913) was an American lawyer, soldier, and politician.

Heard was born in Goshen, Orange County, New York. He moved to Saint Paul, Minnesota and studied law. Heard was admitted to the Minnesota bar and served as the Ramsey County Attorney and as the Saint Paul City Attorney. Heard was involved in the Dakota War of 1862 and served with United States General Henry Hastings Sibley. He served as acting judge advocate involving the Sioux Indians and the Dakota War of 1862. Heard served in the Minnesota Senate in 1872. He died at his home in Goshen, New York and was buried in Saint Paul, Minnesota.
