= Historic Track =

- U.S. National Register of Historic Places
- U.S. National Historic Landmark
- U.S. Historic district – Contributing property
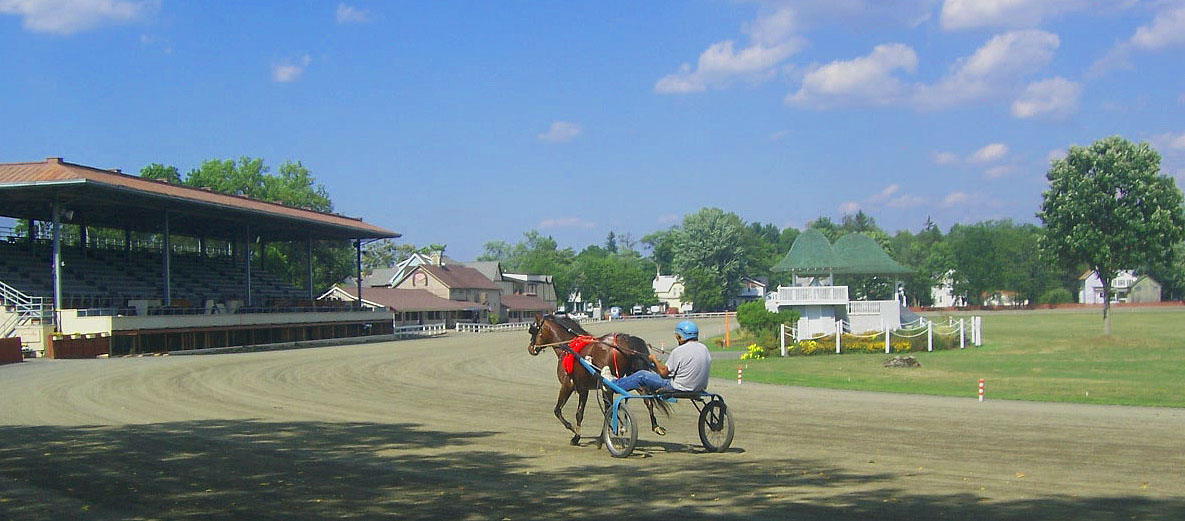
- A trotter working out on the track
- Location: Goshen, NY
- Nearest city: Middletown
- Coordinates: 41°24′08″N 74°19′10″W
- Built: 1838
- Part of: Church Park Historic District (ID80002735)
- NRHP reference No.: 66000560

Significant dates
- Added to NRHP: October 15, 1966
- Designated NHL: May 23, 1966
- Designated CP: November 17, 1980

The Historic Track (officially Goshen Historic Track) is a half-mile (900 m) harness racing track in Goshen, New York. It was opened in 1838 and has been in operation ever since, the oldest continuously operated horse racing track in North America.

Informal horse races had been held along neighboring Main Street, now part of NY 207, since the 1750s. The current track site was first used in 1838 when a ⅓-mile (530 m) circle around a circus ground near the south end of the track was cleared and prepared for regular racing. Later it would be succeeded by an oval track perpendicular to the current one, then a long square track around the whole site, until the current track was built in 1873.

In June 1873, Ulysses Grant, then President of the United States, attended races at the track as he was in town to check on the two children of the late John Aaron Rawlins, for whom Grant served as legal guardian.

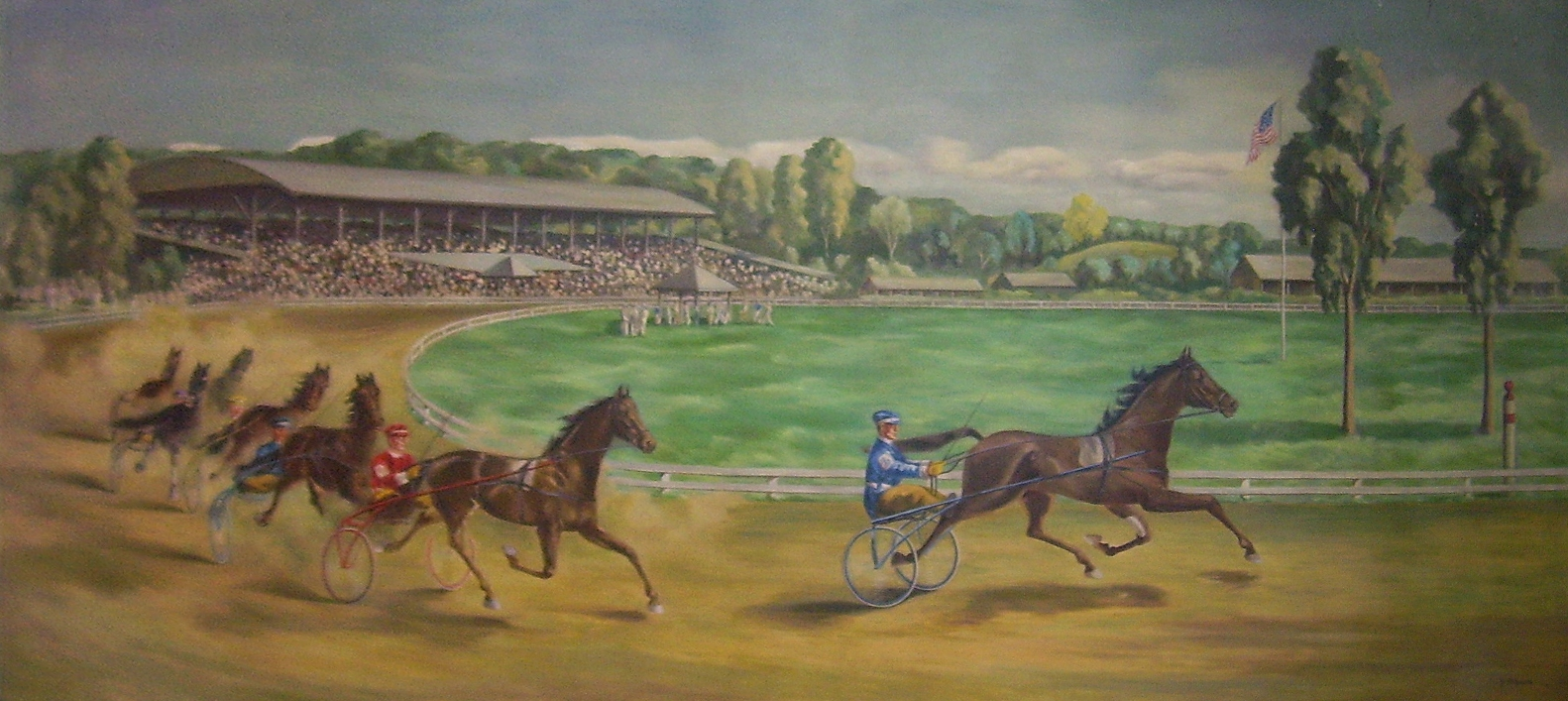
Mural of track in Goshen post office

Regular events were held at the track until the late 1970s, when the parimutuel machines were taken out. Today the track operates a three day racing festival around the July 4th weekend, and more recently an additional day of racing around Labor Day.

The track was designated as a National Historic Landmark in 1966 and was added to the National Register of Historic Places as 'Historic Track' later in the same year, when the National Register was created. The grandstands seat 2,200 fans. In 1980, it was identified as a contributing property to the Church Park Historic District. The Harness Racing Museum & Hall of Fame, run by a separate organization, is located nearby.

In 2017 a fire, possibly started in the blacksmith's shop, destroyed some of the barns and stables on the property. The horses housed in them were saved; the blaze did not affect the grandstand or any of the other buildings on the property. Replacement barns for those that burned were dedicated in 2019.

== See also ==
- List of horse racing venues
- List of National Historic Landmarks in New York
- National Register of Historic Places listings in Orange County, New York
