= Greenoak International School =

Location
- 99 Tombia Road; New GRA, Port Harcourt, Rivers State; Nigeria

Information
- Type: Private, co-educational
- Established: GIS Primary: 2004; GIS Secondary: 2008
- Gender: Mixed
- Age: 5 to 16
- Campus type: Urban
- Affiliations: AISA
- Internet access: Yes
- Website: greenoakinternational.org

Greenoak International School (GIS) is a private primary and secondary school located in New GRA, Port Harcourt, Rivers State. The school caters for children of all nationalities from 5 through to 16 years of age. GIS Primary was founded in September 2004 while GIS Secondary was founded in 2008. The school offers an International Education system, consisting of International Primary Curriculum (IPC), along with American and British curriculum programs. At present, 25% of the students are expatriates while 75% are Nigerians.

== Administration ==
The Managing Director administers the overall affairs of GIS. The Principal is in charge of the day-to-day operation of the school. The Head of Administration and the Academic head are empowered to run their respective areas of duties while an Advisory Committee provides support and ideas to aid GIS’s progress. The Board of GIS is tasked with policy formulation for the wellbeing of the school.

== Facilities ==
The following facilities can be found at Greenoak's school campus:

- Furnished classrooms
- Outdoor farms
- Fish pond
- Multi-purpose hall
- Libraries
- Musical orchestra
- Home Economics studio
- Science laboratories
- Zoological pond
- Sports ground
- Infirmary
- Arts and Crafts studio
- ICT suite
