= Jizz =

Jizz may refer to:

- Jizz (birding), the immediately recognisable characteristics of a bird or other organism
- Jizz, a vulgar slang for semen
- "Jizz", an episode of season 1 of Satisfaction
- Jizz, a PC 64k intro by The Black Lotus at Wired 1997
- Jizz, a character on Beaver Falls
- Jizz, the genre of music played by the Max Rebo Band in Star Wars
- Jizz Hornkamp (born 1998), Dutch footballer
