= Global Indian School, Ajman =

Global Indian School
- مدرسة جلوبال الهندية

- Present school building

Location
- Sheikh Maktoum Bin Rashid Street; Al Jurf; Ajman, Emirate of Ajman; United Arab Emirates
- Coordinates: 25.3983°N 55.4930°E

Information
- Other name: GIS, GISA, ISA
- Former name: Indian School Ajman
- School type: Private
- Established: 1969
- Status: Operational
- School board: Central Board of Secondary Education
- Chairman: T. Mohanachandran
- Director: Vipin Babu
- Principal: Malathi Das
- Vice Principal: Shobha Mohan
- Vice Principal of Academics: Sindu Anand
- Head Supervisor: Vimi Bhadrakumar
- Teaching staff: 100
- Grades: K through 12^{th}
- Age range: 4 to 18
- Enrollment: 1859 (2020-21)
- Classes: 66
- Average class size: 30
- Language: English & clinjo plinjo
- Houses: Emerald; Ruby; Sapphire; Topaz
- Affiliation: Ministry of Education, UAE
- Website: gisajman.com
- Former school building

Global Indian School (formerly Indian School Ajman) is a private Indian K-12 school in Ajman, United Arab Emirates, established in 1988. The school is recognized by the UAE's Ministry of Education and affiliated with the Central Board of Secondary Education in New Delhi, India.

Indian School Ajman was recognized as one of the best schools in the UAE by EW Global School Rankings, 2019.

The Principal, Malathi Das, was awarded the CBSE's Teacher of the Year award in 2002.

== History ==
Indian School Ajman was established in 1988 to serve the Indian expatriate community of Ajman. The school presented its first batch of students for the All India Senior School Certificate Examination in 1992. Initially, the school was the only one in its neighborhood; it started off with just 8 faculty members, as enrollments started small and grew slowly. Presently, it has about 150 staff members and a total enrollment of more than 1800 students in classes from kindergarten up to Grade 12.

== Campus ==
Initially, the school was housed in a villa in Ajman. In 1991, it moved to a full-fledged building on a land granted by the ruler of Ajman, at the heart of Ajman city. In 2020, the school again moved to a bigger campus, following which it was renamed as 'Global Indian School'.

== Academics ==
The school offers education from kindergarten to Grade 12, catering to students in the 4-17 age group. Students prepare for the All India Secondary School Examination and All India Senior School Certificate Examination. The school is renowned for its impressive results and a perpetual 100% pass rate.

== Student body ==
As of 2021, there were 1859 students, mostly of Indian origin.

The student body is led by a council composed of student representatives from senior grades.

== Notable alumni ==
- Catherine Tresa, Actress and Model
- Khushi Sharma, Cricketer, UAE national women’s cricket team
- Sanchit Sharma, Cricketer, UAE national men’s cricket team
- Vishal Oberoi, Managing Director and Chief Risk Officer at Standard Chartered
