= Granada Islamic School =

Coordinates: 37.37669°N 121.95975°W

Location
- 3003 Scott Blvd, Santa Clara, CA 95054

Information
- Type: Private School
- Motto: We Believe. We Achieve. We Soar
- Founded: 1988
- Enrollment: 491
- Color: Red Gold
- Mascot: Golden Eagle
- Information: 408-980-1161
- Website: Granada Islamic School

Granada Islamic School is a K-12 school in Santa Clara, California established in 1988 by the Muslim Community Association. Granada Islamic School is the largest Islamic school in the San Francisco Bay Area, and is accredited by the Western Association of Schools & Colleges. Granada Islamic School (GIS) was founded in 1988 in Santa Clara, California, in memory of Granada, Spain (Andalusia) - the beacon of Islamic civilization in the West. Non-profit, Granada currently has a student body of about 500 students PK-12th Grades. Granada currently has a preschool, an elementary school, a middle school, and a high school. The high school is relatively new and is yet to fully develop.
