= Dale Memmelaar =

American football player (1937–2009)

No. 63, 71, 70, 61, 62, 67
- Positions: Guard, tackle

Personal information
- Born: January 15, 1937; Hawthorne, New Jersey, U.S.
- Died: March 17, 2009 (aged 72); Cornwall, New York, U.S.
- Listed height: 6 ft 2 in (1.88 m)
- Listed weight: 247 lb (112 kg)

Career information
- High school: Goshen Central (NY)
- College: Wyoming
- NFL draft: 1959: 21st round, 242nd overall pick

Career history
- Chicago/St. Louis Cardinals (1959–1961); Minnesota Vikings (1962)*; Dallas Cowboys (1962–1963); Cleveland Browns (1964–1965); Atlanta Falcons (1966)*; Baltimore Colts (1966–1967)
- * Offseason or practice squad member only

Awards and highlights
- NFL champion (1964); 2× All-Big Sky (1957, 1958)

Career NFL statistics
- Games played: 107
- Games started: 46
- Fumble recoveries: 2
- Stats at Pro Football Reference

Dale Edward Memmelaar (January 15, 1937 – March 17, 2009) was an American professional football offensive lineman in the National Football League (NFL) for the Chicago/St. Louis Cardinals, Dallas Cowboys, Cleveland Browns, and Baltimore Colts. He played college football at the University of Wyoming.

== Early life ==
Memmelaar attended Goshen Central High School in Goshen, New York. He also practiced baseball, basketball and track.

Memmelaar accepted a football scholarship from the University of Wyoming, where he was a three-year starter at offensive tackle. In 1956, he contributed to the team finishing with a 10-0 record.

As a senior Memmelaar was named team captain, contributing to the Skyline Conference Championship and the 14-6 defeat of Hardin–Simmons University in the Sun Bowl. He also was a professional baseball prospect as a pitcher.

== Professional career ==
=== Chicago/St. Louis Cardinals ===
Memmelaar was selected in the 21st round (242nd overall) of the 1959 NFL draft by the Chicago Cardinals. He was a backup player at offensive tackle and offensive guard. In 1961, Memmelaar's military service caused him to miss four games.

In August 1962, Memmelaar was traded to the Minnesota Vikings in exchange for a draft choice (not exercised). He was returned to the Cardinals after two weeks and was promptly waived.

=== Dallas Cowboys ===
In September 1962, Memmelaar was claimed off waivers by the Dallas Cowboys and became a starter at right guard for two years. He also served as the team's barber. Memmelaar was released on August 17, 1964.

=== Cleveland Browns ===
On August 20, 1964, Memmelaar was signed as a free agent by the Cleveland Browns. He was a reserve pulling guard for running back Jim Brown. Memmelaar helped win the NFL Championship 27-0 against the Baltimore Colts. The next year, the Browns again reached the NFL Championship game, but lost 12-23 against the Green Bay Packers.

=== Atlanta Falcons ===
Memmelaar was selected by the Atlanta Falcons in the 1966 NFL expansion draft. On June 21, 1966, he was traded to the Baltimore Colts in exchange for a sixth round draft choice (#151-Martine Bircher).

=== Baltimore Colts ===
In 1966, he was acquired to provide depth in case Alex Sandusky retired. Memmelaar was a reserve player with the Baltimore Colts for two years. In 1967, he was on the Colts' reserve squad while recuperating from a knee injury, until being activated on December 8, to replace the retired Jim Parker.

== Personal life ==
Dale Memmelaar was one of eleven children, with nine brothers and one sister. His experience cutting his siblings' hair as children led him to become his team's barber while with the Dallas Cowboys.

After retiring from playing football, Memmelaar worked as an assistant football coach and teacher at Newburgh Free Academy and then as a teacher, head football coach, assistant principal and athletic director at Washingtonville High School.

He was married and had two children. Memmelaar was a born again Christian. He attended Christian Faith Fellowship Church in Middletown, New York.
