= NextBus =

NextBus is a public transit vehicle tracking system which uses automatic vehicle location (AVL) information, often from global positioning satellite receivers, to predict when the next vehicle will arrive at any given transit stop, which attempts to reduce wait times and reliance on schedules.

NextBus is developed by Nextbus Information Systems, Inc., a subsidiary of Cubic Transportation Systems, for buses, trams, light rail operations and other public transport vehicles.

The company was founded by Ken Schmier, Bryce Nesbitt and Paul Freda in 1997 in Emeryville, California with U.S. Patents 6,006,159 & 6,374,176. As of 2013, the company's systems were operating in over 130 locations. NextBus Information Systems, Inc. was previously a subsidiary of Webtech Wireless, Inc. and was acquired by Cubic Transportation Systems in January 2013.

== Overview ==
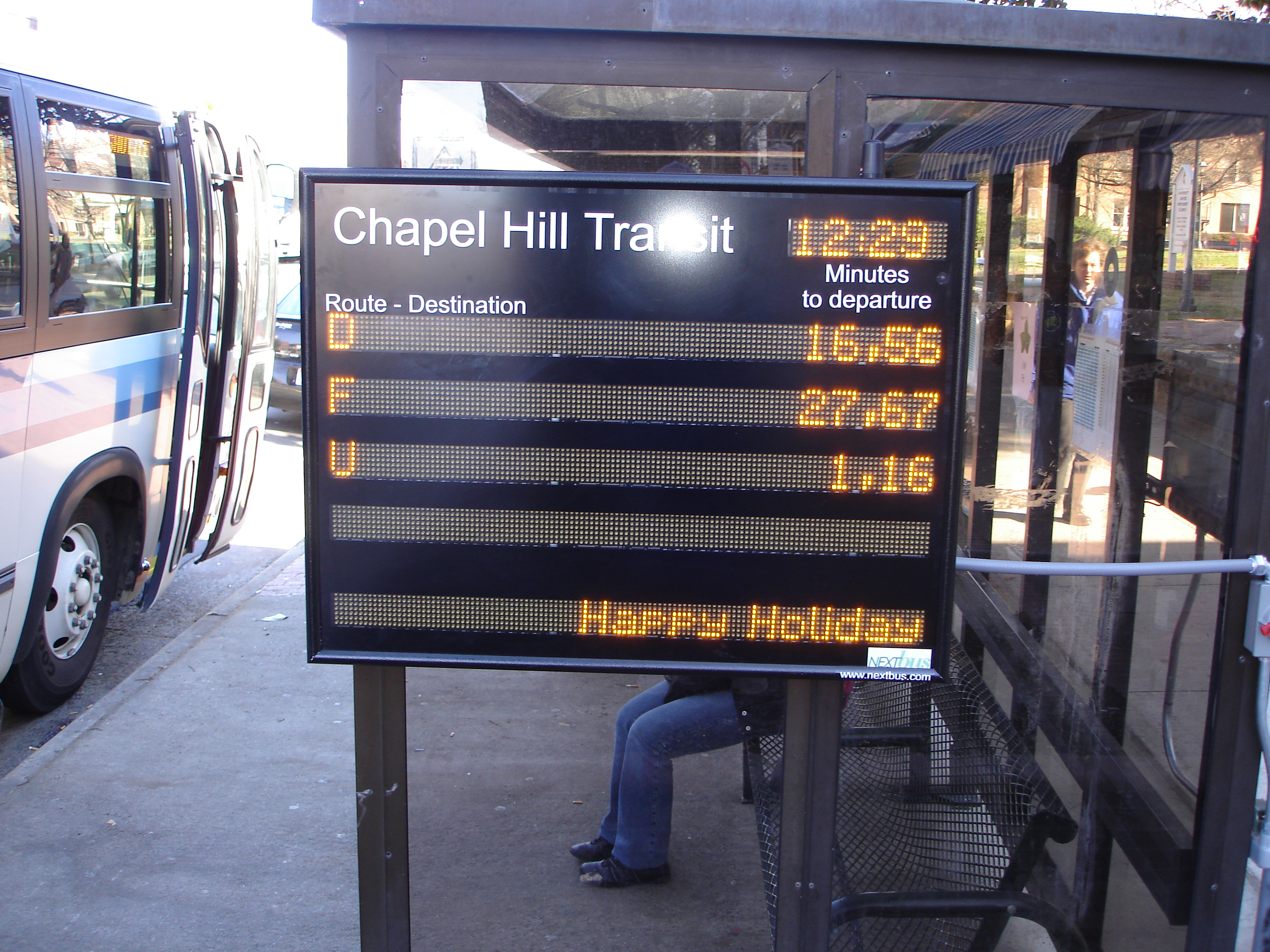
Chapel Hill Transit bus stop with NextBus display board, Chapel Hill, North Carolina

Each vehicle is fitted with a GPS tracking device, which transmits speed and location data (telematics) to a central server. There, a computer running proprietary software calculates the projected arrival times for all stops in the system using this data, along with configuration information and historic travel times. These times are then converted to a 'wait time' and made available via the NextBus website and electronic signs at bus stops and tram stops as well as cell phones, and other wireless devices via the Internet.

== Usage ==
NextBus provides a real-time passenger information system for all routes for several major transportation agencies including the San Francisco Municipal Railway, Los Angeles County Metropolitan Transportation Authority, the Massachusetts Bay Transportation Authority, and the Toronto Transit Commission. The system is also available in many other smaller universities and public transportation agencies for a total of approximately 100 systems.
