= Goshen Central High School =

Public school in New York, United States

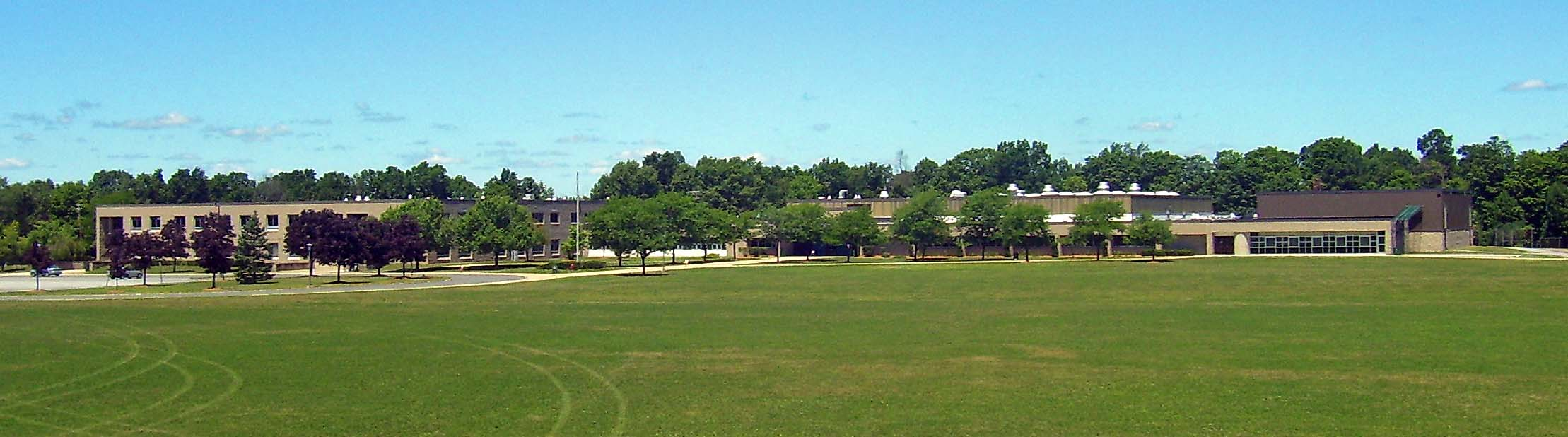
- GCHS seen from nearby housing development, 2007

Location
- 222 Scotchtown Avenue; Goshen, New York; United States; 41.4178°N 74.3238°W

Information
- Type: Public
- Established: 1975
- School district: Goshen Central School District
- Superintendent: Kurtis Kotes
- Principal: Nicholas Pantaleone
- Staff: 7
- Teaching staff: 80.16 (FTE)
- Grades: 9-12
- Student to teacher ratio: 12.42
- Colors: Red and Blue
- Nickname: Gladiators
- Website: www.gcsny.org/goshen-high-school/

Goshen Central High School educates students in grades 9-12 from the Goshen Central School District, which largely overlaps the town and village of the same name in Orange County, New York, United States. It is located just outside the north end of the village, located at the end of a short access road off Scotchtown Avenue behind the district's school bus garage and Scotchtown Avenue Elementary School.

Constructed in 1975, it is the newest of the district's four buildings. Many period architectural elements are in evidence within, from the earth tones predominant in the hallways and classrooms, carpeting in some, skylights and a courtyard in the south wing. The school's library is named for Noah Webster, who taught in Goshen as a young man in the late 18th century.

The 1997 Boys' Cross Country team is the only GHS team to win a state championship.

The 2009 Odyssey of the Mind team won the world championship.

The Boys' Varsity Tennis team has not lost a Conference Title in over 10 years.

The Mock Trial team has won the county championship for mock trial in Orange County for nine of the last ten years, 2005-2014.

== Notable alumni ==
- Izett Buchanan (b. 1972), expatriate professional basketball player
- Chris Caffery (b. 1967), professional guitar player for the band Savatage, Chris Caffery Band and the Trans-Siberian Orchestra.
- Dale Memmelaar (1937–2009), NFL offensive lineman from 1959 through 1967.
- Malcolm Shabazz (1984−2013), grandson and first male descendant of Malcolm X
