= Orange County Government Center =

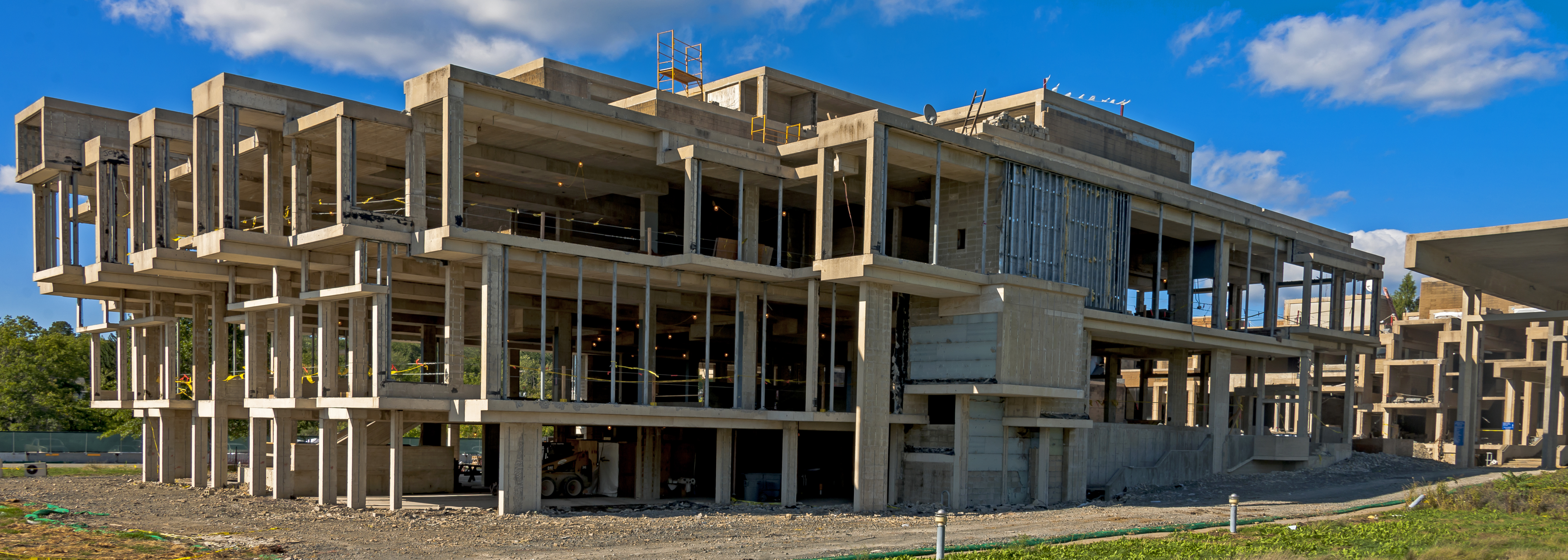
- South view during demolition, 2015

General information
- Architectural style: Brutalist
- Location: Goshen, NY, United States
- Coordinates: 41°24′22″N 74°19′06″W
- Completed: 1967
- Demolished: 2015
- Client: Orange County

Design and construction
- Architect: Paul Rudolph

The Orange County Government Center, located on Main Street (NY 207) in Goshen, New York, was the main office of the government of Orange County. It housed most county officials' offices and meetings of the county legislature. The records of Orange County Court and all deeds and mortgages filed in the county were kept there as well. An office of the New York State Department of Motor Vehicles was located on the first floor.

As of December 2015, the center section of the building has been demolished, over objections by architectural preservationists.

== History and contested demolition ==
The building was designed by noted architect and dean of the Yale School of Architecture Paul Rudolph in 1963 and built in 1967. A courtyard divided the portion of the building hosting the executive and legislative branches from the half that hosted County Court until the late 1990s, when the state's Court Facilities Capital Review Board deemed the old courthouse unfit for use. A new addition was built to its north to house the courts and opened in the early 2000s, at considerable cost and frequent delay.

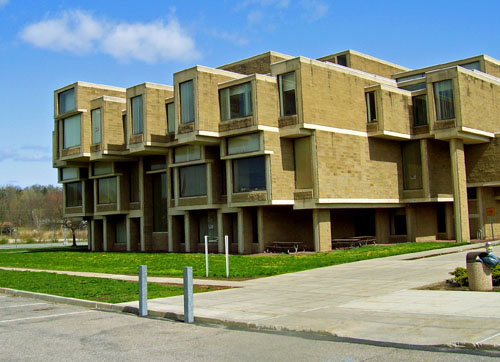
South facade in 2006

Its architecture has been subject to criticism. At the time of its construction it was called a "monstrosity". "If I took a poll in town, it would be demolished tomorrow," Former County Executive Edward A. Diana said in 2010. That year he proposed a replacement building, but the county legislature balked at the $114 million cost during difficult economic times.

The building had problems over its life. It leaked severely enough after a heavy storm in 1970 that the Finance Department had to stretch a tarpaulin across the ceiling. Today many of its 87 roofs leak and it had also become expensive to heat.

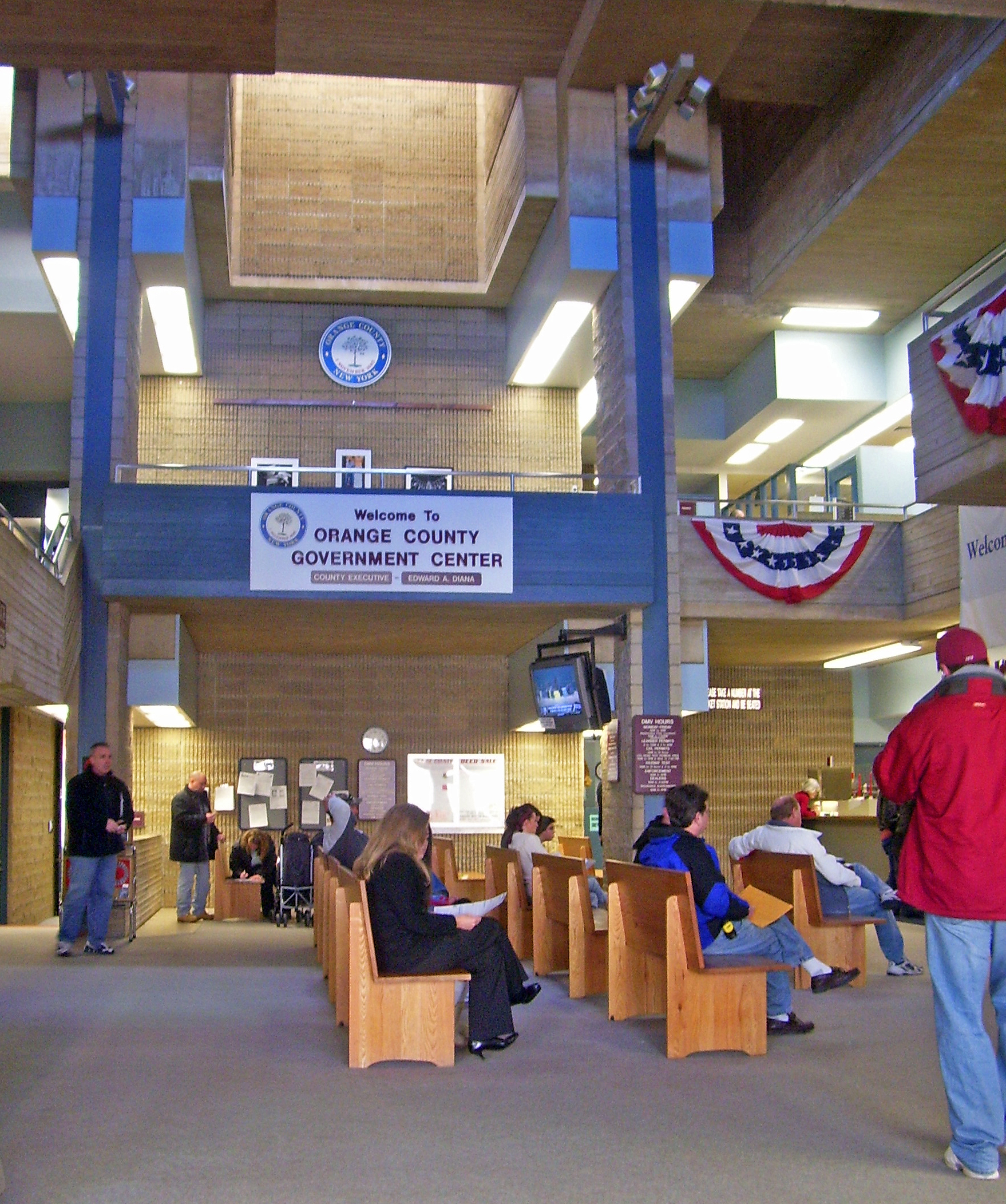
DMV office in interior atrium.

Diana considered demolishing it to build a new one in early 2004. However, the costs of doing so were prohibitive enough that the idea was dropped. At the same time it was uncertain whether it would be feasible to repair the building, and demolition was still considered the strongest possibility.

There had been some architects who had urged the building's preservation, however, pointing to its historic value, Rudolph's stature as an architect, and the imaginative use of space within the building. The Paul Rudolph Foundation had been working to preserve both it and Chorley School in nearby Middletown, which had been slated for demolition. New York's State Historic Preservation Office has found it eligible for listing on the state and National Registers of Historic Places, and an online campaign was begun to save it for both historic and economic reasons.

In 2011, flood damage from Hurricane Irene closed the building for over a week. Mold had been growing in spaces in some rooms, including the grand jury room, and there were concerns it might become unsafe for use by those with respiratory problems. The day after it reopened, the remnants of Tropical Storm Lee deluged the area, and on September 8, it was closed again until further notice. The following week, Diana pressed county legislators to make a decision soon on whether to renovate the building or restore it.

On October 13, 2011, it was reported that the World Monuments Fund, citing its architecture, had added the Government Center to its biennial list of worldwide cultural heritage sites at risk. Zaha Hadid said that the integrity and the interconnectivity of the building served as the expression of democracy, since elected representatives are not separated from the constituents. As of year-end, the county—under pressure from the state's Office of Court Administration (OCA)—announced an emergency plan to open temporary courtroom space nearby in January, while development of a two-year restoration project proceeded.

Near the end of the year the OCA sent Diana a strongly worded letter complaining that his office had not yet informed them as to the county's plans to replace closed courtrooms. "Our judges and staff are doing the best that they can, sharing courtrooms and chambers in other facilities, staggering appointment calendars and delaying trials," said Ronald Younkins, chief of operations for the OCA. "The situation is unacceptable and unfair to the judges, court staff, litigants, the bar, jurors and the public at large."

Younkins said that two OCA employees and an architect with the state's Dormitory Authority who had toured the building had written reports saying the damage to the courts could be repaired for as little as $381,000 rather than replacing the entire building. Diana, he said, had also missed a deadline the previous week to submit long-term plans to the OCA. The agency threatened to withhold state aid to the county. Diana responded that the reports the OCA cited did not go into sufficient detail as to how the work could be done cheaply, and he had believed those issues had been previously resolved.

After its closing in 2011 due to hurricane damage, in the end, the building was renovated, with large parts of it destroyed and rebuilt in the renovation. It reopened in 2017.
