= Goshen (village), New York =

Goshen
- Village
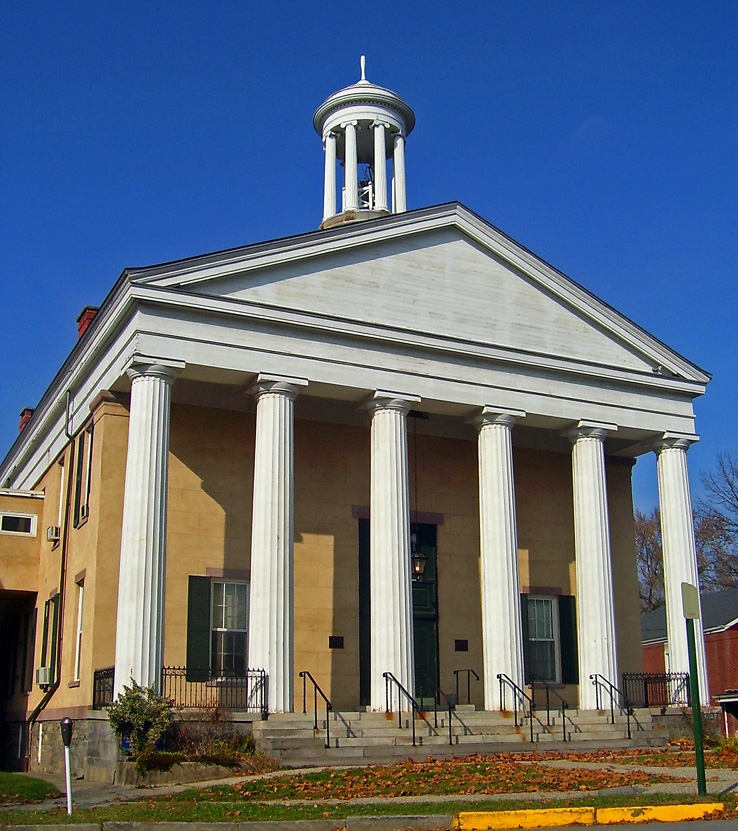
- 1841 Courthouse

- Location within New York Location within the United States
- Coordinates: 41°24′N 74°19′W
- Country: United States
- State: New York
- County: Orange
- Town: Goshen
- Settled: 1714
- Incorporated: 1809

Government
  - Mayor: Molly O'Donnell

Area
  - Total: 3.32 sq mi (8.60 km^{2})
  - Land: 3.32 sq mi (8.60 km^{2})
  - Water: 0 sq mi (0.00 km^{2}) 0%
- Elevation: 430 ft (130 m)

Population (2020)
  - Total: 5,777
  - Density: 1,739.9/sq mi (671.77/km^{2})
- Time zone: UTC-5 (EST)
  - Summer (DST): UTC-4 (EDT)
- ZIP Code: 10924
- Area code: 845
- FIPS code: 36-29542
- Website: www.villageofgoshen-ny.gov

Goshen is a village in and the county seat of Orange County, New York, United States. The population was 5,777 at the 2020 census. It is part of the Kiryas Joel-Poughkeepsie-Newburgh metropolitan area as well as the larger New York metropolitan area.

The village is within the town of Goshen, some fifty miles northwest of New York City, on New York State Route 17 in the center of Orange County. Goshen is the home of the Harness Racing Museum & Hall of Fame, and hosted harness racing's top event, the Hambletonian, from 1930 to 1956, at the former Good Time Park. Racing is still held at the Historic Track, a National Historic Landmark in the center of the village.

== History ==
The village was settled in 1714 and incorporated on March 28, 1809. In 1727 it was declared the "half-shire town" of Orange County, a predecessor to its current status as county seat. It did not take on that full status, however, until Rockland County was split from the county in 1798, and Goshen was designated the seat since Orangetown was in the new county. For a while afterward it shared that status with Newburgh, moved into Orange as compensation for the lost territory, but since the late 19th century all county government functions have been centralized in Goshen.

Goshen was the site of the hanging of the famous outlaw Claudius Smith, a British Loyalist who— along with the Mohawk Indian Chief Joseph Brant— raided the countryside surrounding Goshen during the American Revolutionary War. He and Brandt are said to have buried their many stolen treasures in the hills surrounding Goshen, and that Claudius is himself buried somewhere on the grounds of the old Presbyterian Church – with his skull having been embedded in the wall. Smith was hanged on January 22, 1779, and exactly six months later, on July 22, 1779, Brant raided what is now Port Jervis. A militia from Goshen set out to stop Brant, engaging in the disastrous Battle of Minisink, in which 45 local militiamen were killed. A monument in the center of town marks the spot where their bones were buried in a mass grave 43 years after the battle.

As early as the 1750s, residents used to race their horses along what is now Main Street in the village's downtown. In 1838, a circular track was built around a nearby circus ground. This was the first incarnation of the Historic Track, where races are still held for one week each year, making it the oldest horse racing facility still in use in the United States. Later, the larger Good Time Park was built, which hosted the Hambletonian in later years. The Harness Racing Museum & Hall of Fame near the track recognizes Goshen's historic importance to the sport.

In the early 20th century, the village was the home of the Interpines sanitarium, as well as the Coates-Goshen automobile, which was built and produced for two years from 1908 to 1910. In 1950, Goshen had a population of 3,311 people. By 1990, the village had been largely built out, and the number of people stood at 5,255; despite a building boom in the town, the village has remained about the same size.

In 1992, the tiny, provincial village was rocked by the same criminal, Catholic priesthood pedophilia that was gradually being exposed nation and worldwide. Fr. Edward Pipala (then age 53) the pastor of St. John the Evangelist, R. Catholic Church on Murray Ave, had been molesting troubled, young teens in a number of parishes, including Sacred Heart in Monroe, Staten Island and Croton Falls for decades.

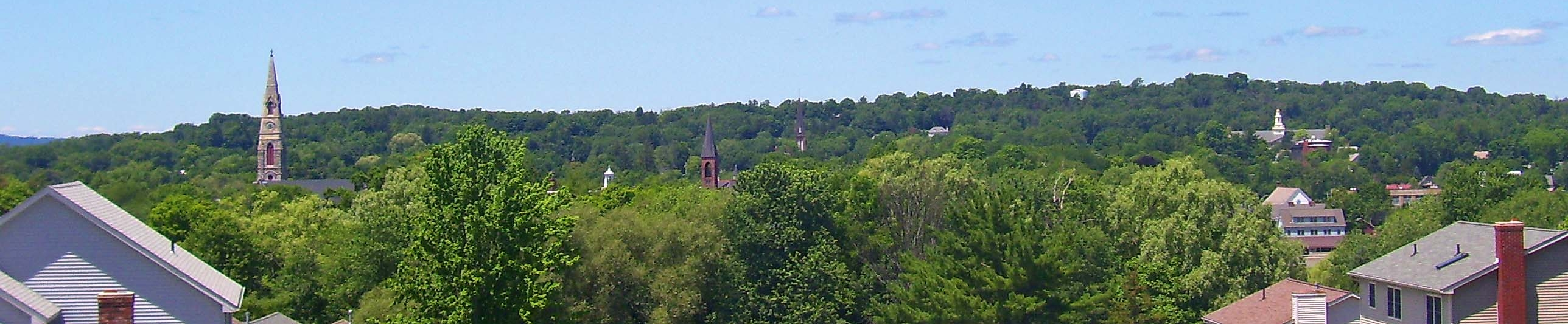
Goshen from the hills at Goshen's eastern boundary; from left, the tower of the First Presbyterian Church, the cupola of the 1841 courthouse, the Goshen United Methodist Church, St. John the Evangelist Roman Catholic Church and C. J. Hooker Middle School.

== Demographics ==
Historical population
| Census | Pop. | Note | %± |
|---|---|---|---|
| 1870 | 2,205 | | — |
| 1880 | 2,557 | | 16.0% |
| 1890 | 2,907 | | 13.7% |
| 1900 | 2,826 | | −2.8% |
| 1910 | 3,081 | | 9.0% |
| 1920 | 2,843 | | −7.7% |
| 1930 | 2,891 | | 1.7% |
| 1940 | 3,073 | | 6.3% |
| 1950 | 3,311 | | 7.7% |
| 1960 | 3,906 | | 18.0% |
| 1970 | 4,342 | | 11.2% |
| 1980 | 4,874 | | 12.3% |
| 1990 | 5,255 | | 7.8% |
| 2000 | 5,676 | | 8.0% |
| 2010 | 5,454 | | −3.9% |
| 2020 | 5,777 | | 5.9% |
U.S. Decennial Census

As of the census of 2000, there were 5,676 people, 2,039 households, and 1,227 families residing in the village. The population density was 1,770.5 inhabitants per square mile (683.6/km^{2}). There were 2,150 housing units at an average density of 670.7 per square mile (259.0/km^{2}). The racial makeup of the village was 87.53% white, 7.61% black or African American, .14% Native American, 1.55% Asian, .07% Pacific Islander, 2.26% from other races, and .85% from two or more races. Hispanic or Latino of any race were 7.63% of the population.

There were 2,039 households, out of which 29.8% had children under the age of 18 living with them, 47.3% were married couples living together, 9.8% had a female householder with no husband present, and 39.8% were non-families. 34.8% of all households were made up of individuals, and 17.8% had someone living alone who was 65 years of age or older. The average household size was 2.40 and the average family size was 3.14.

In the village, the population was spread out, with 22.3% under the age of 18, 8.9% from 18 to 24, 29.5% from 25 to 44, 21.1% from 45 to 64, and 18.2% who were 65 years of age or older. The median age was 38 years. For every 100 females, there were 102.1 males. For every 100 females age 18 and over, there were 100.4 males.

The median income for a household in the village was $50,922, and the median income for a family was $66,250. Males had a median income of $41,932 versus $31,711 for females. The per capita income for the village was $22,443. About 1.9% of families and 4.0% of the population were below the poverty line, including 0.8% of those under age 18 and 7.3% of those age 65 or over.

== Government ==
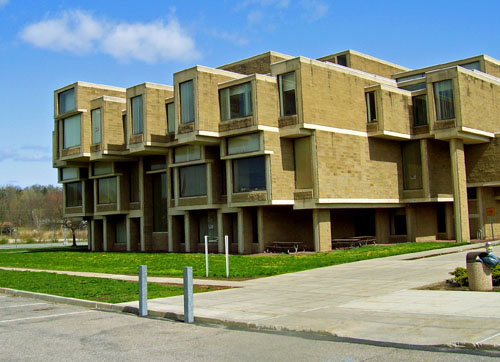
The brutalist Orange County Government Center.

The village has a mayor-council government that follows the same form as all other villages with that government in New York: a five-member village board consisting of a mayor and four trustees, all with equal voting power. The mayor is the village's chief executive and carries out all day-to-day management functions. The mayor is Molly O'Donnell and the four trustees are Cynthia Hand, Chris Gurda, Jonathan Rouis, and Scott Wohl.

The Orange County Government Center is located in Goshen; a brutalist work by Paul Rudolph.

== Infrastructure ==
Fire protection is provided to the village by the Goshen Fire Department, an all-volunteer organization comprising three fire companies (Dikeman Engine and Hose, Cataract Engine and Hose and Minisink Hook and Ladder). Each of the companies are housed in separate modern fire stations located in the district.

== Notable people ==
- Noah Webster taught here in the 1780s. The local high school's library is named after him, as is Webster Street, where the town's offices are located.
- Henry Wisner represented New York in the Continental Congress, produced gunpowder for George Washington and his troops, and participated in efforts to block passage of the British along the Hudson River during the American Revolution. An obelisk in memory of him sits prominently across from St. James Episcopal Church and was erected in 1897.
- Henry Lawrence Burnett, a Brevet Brigadier General in the Union Army, who was a prosecutor on the tribunal that convicted the Lincoln assassins, lived his later life in Goshen, where he died.
- Anna Elizabeth Dickinson, an abolitionist and advocate for women's suffrage (October 28, 1842 – October 22, 1932), an orator, writer, actress, and teacher who lived in Goshen the last 40 years of her life.
- Horace Pippin, Black painter, raised & educated in segregated Goshen schools.
- William Henry Seward, Lincoln's Secretary of State, once lived in Goshen.
- Willie "The Lion" Smith, jazz pianist, born in Goshen, who has been honored since 2004 with the Goshen Jazz Festival.
- Dale Memmelaar, (1937-2009) NFL Lineman Guard/Tackle, (played for the Cowboys, Browns, Cardinals, and Colts from 1959 to 1967)
- Howard Mills III, former assemblyman and US Senate candidate was born in Goshen.
- Bill Bayno, former college and NBA coach
- Lauren Hough, Olympian (equestrian, 2000) was born in Goshen.
- John McLoughlin, a survivor of the September 11 attacks, currently resides in Goshen.
