= Goshen, New York =

Goshen
- Town
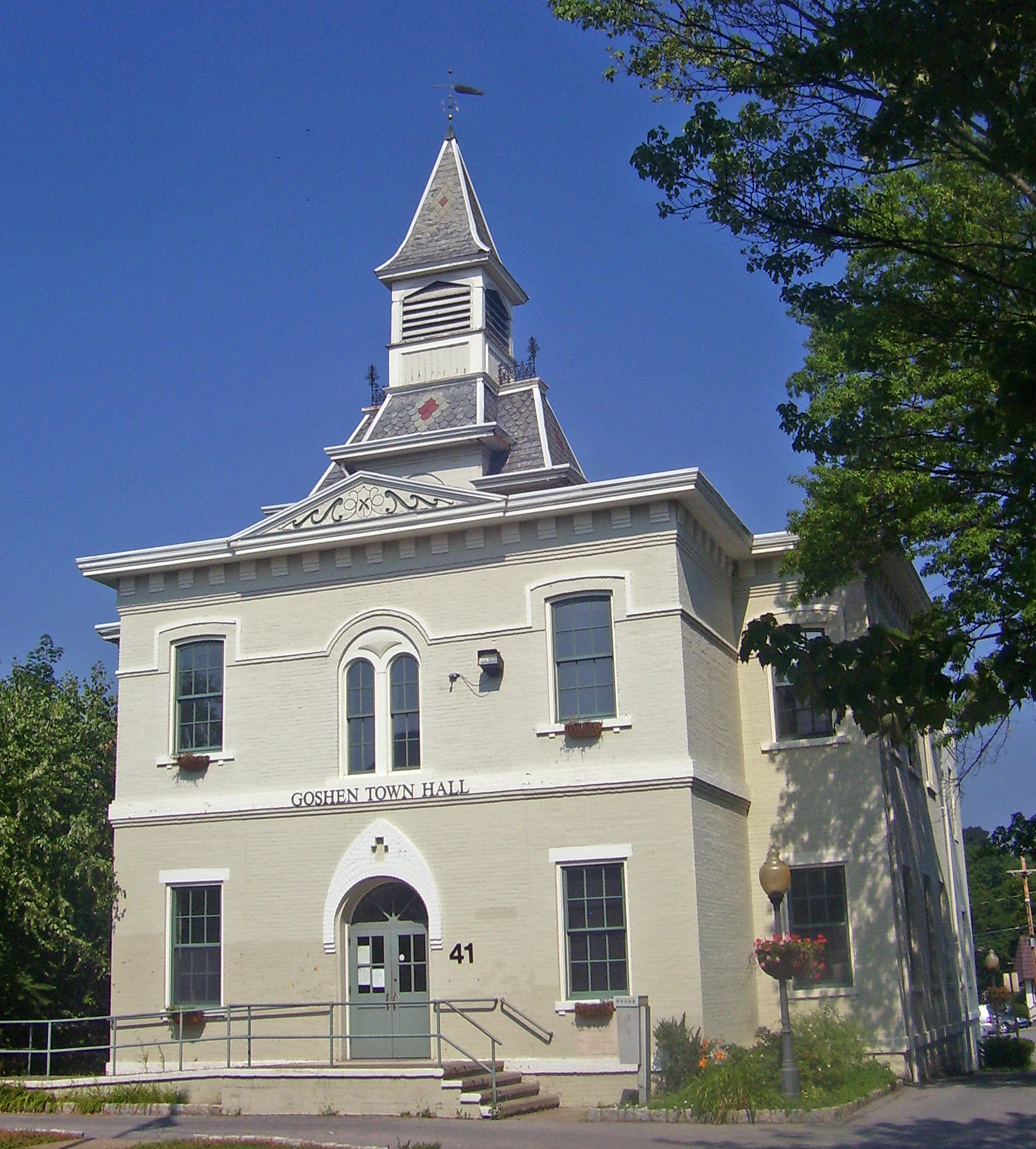
- Goshen Town Hall, in the village of Goshen
- Motto: Slow-motion Goshen (unofficial)
- Anthem: Goshen Fight Song

- Location of New York in the United States
- Coordinates: 41°24′06″N 74°19′37″W
- Country: United States
- State: New York
- County: Orange

Government
  - Town Supervisor: Joe Betro (R)
  - Town Council: Members: George M. Lyons (R); Douglass Bloomfield (R); Philip Canterino (D); Richard Florio (R)

Area
  - Total: 43.93 sq mi (113.78 km^{2})
  - Land: 43.64 sq mi (113.03 km^{2})
  - Water: 0.29 sq mi (0.75 km^{2})

Population (2020)
  - Total: 14,571
- Time zone: UTC-5 (EST)
  - Summer (DST): UTC-4 (EDT)
- Postal code: 10924
- Area code: 845
- FIPS code: 36-071-29553
- Website: townofgoshenny.gov

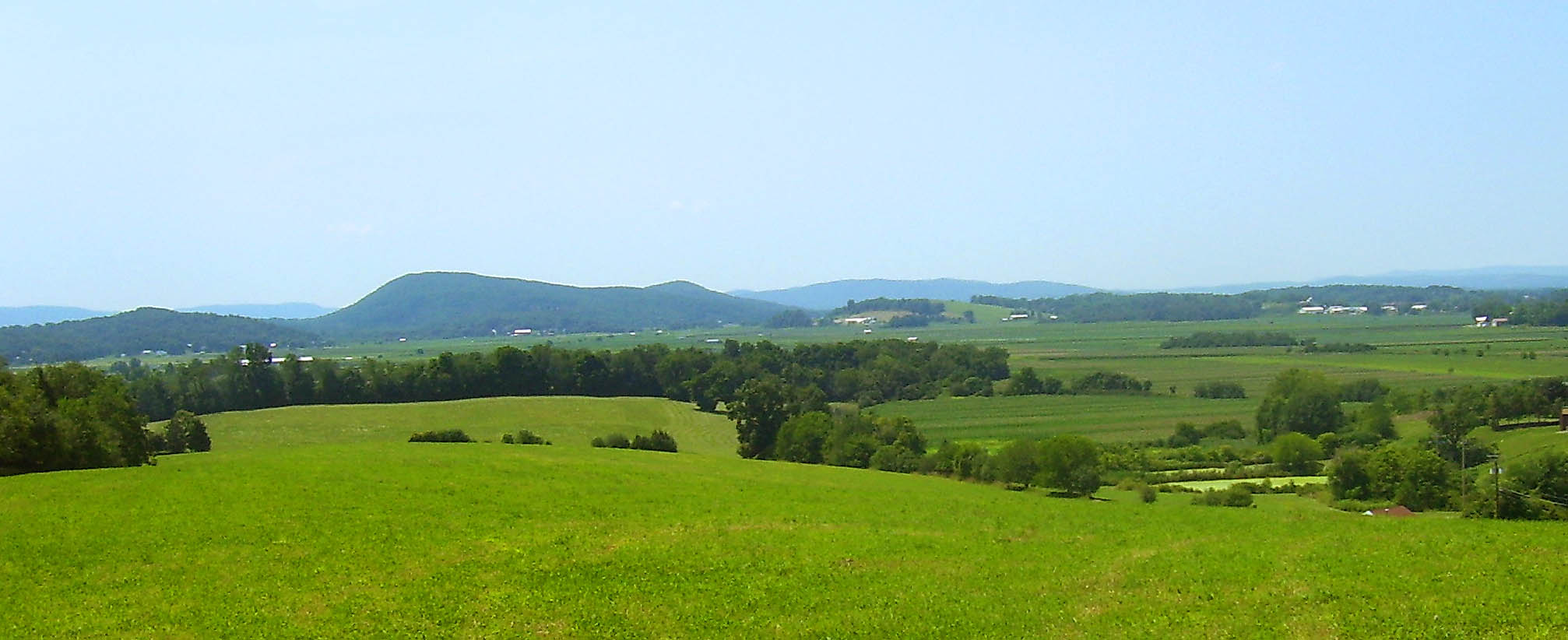
Farmland in the Town of Goshen

Goshen is a town in Orange County, New York, United States. The population was 14,571 at the 2020 census. The town is named after the Biblical Land of Goshen. It contains a village also called Goshen, which is the county seat of Orange County. The town is centrally located in the county.

== History ==
=== Colonization ===
European settlement began around 1714, although plans for this were made beginning about 1654. The town was established in 1788, after the American Revolutionary War and New York becoming a state. As population increased in the area, in 1830, part of Goshen was divided off to form the new Town of Hamptonburgh. In 1845, another part was used to form the Town of Chester.

When the French and Indian War began in 1756, the men of Goshen took up arms. The Journal of the Assembly relates the services of Captain George DeKay as an express between Goshen and Minisink. It mentions as his guards Peter Carter, David Benjamin, Philip Reid, and Francis Armstrong. It tells also that Colonel Vincent Mathews was paid two pounds to furnish guides to regulars posted at Goshen from October 1757, to February 1758. Colonels Clinton and DeKay fortified block houses for the settlers' defense. Samuel Gale was paid 56 pounds to furnish provisions to troops on the frontiers near Goshen. Colonel Benj. Tusten, Captain Daniel Case, and Captain J. Bull were reimbursed for their expenses in building block houses Nos. 1 and 2 on the western frontier in January 1757.

In 1763, Governor Cadwallader Colden appealed to the General Assembly for troops to relieve the militia on the borders of Orange and Ulster counties, an area infiltrated by the enemy. At this time the Town of Goshen extended from the Hudson River to the New Jersey border. In 1764 a bill was passed dividing the precinct of Goshen into two precincts, to be called Goshen and Cornwall. After this division, Cornwall embraced the present towns of Cornwall, Monroe and Blooming Grove, while Goshen included the present town of Warwick.

=== American revolution ===
Revolutionary fervor built in the years before war broke out in the late eighteenth century. On June 8, 1775, over 360 men signed the Revolutionary pledge at Goshen, headed by Henry Wisner at the top of the list. Once General George Washington, riding eastward on the Florida road toward his headquarters at Newburgh, stopped with his staff to chat with local children at the old school house near the stone quarry.

The Battle of Minisink took place on July 22, 1779. The Goshen regiment, under Colonel Tusten, was nearly defeated by an estimated 500 Indians and Tories under the command of Mohawk leader Joseph Brant, also known as Thayendanegea, the Scourge, who held a colonel's commission from George III. The Goshen regiment marched against Brant's forces in response to a raid made by Brant upon the settlers near Minisink on July 20. They were joined by a small reinforcement, under Colonel Hathorn, of the Warwick regiment, and the latter assumed command. While marching along the west bank of the Delaware River, they discovered the Indians about three quarters of a mile away, and Colonel Hathorn chased them. Brant took advantage of the woods and moved to the rear of the attacking party. His forces completely routed the small colonial force that opposed them. The colonists had little ammunition and some fled; more men were killed in that stage than in battle. Colonel Tusten, a surgeon, dressed his men's wounds and stayed on the field until he became a casualty. Of the 80 Goshen men in the engagement, 44 were killed outright and numerous others died later of their wounds.

Colonel Benjamin Tusten, who was a physician and surgeon by profession, came originally from Southold, L. I., in 1746, at the age of three years. His parents located on the banks of the Otterkill on the patent granted to Elizabeth Denn. His father, Benjamin Tusten, was appointed one of the judges of the courts of the county and also a colonel in the Orange County regiment of militia. The son, Benjamin, was sent to an academy at Jamaica, Long Island. At age nineteen, he returned to Goshen to study medicine with Doctor Thomas Wiskham. He later studied further in Newark, New Jersey, and New York City., returning in 1769 to practice medicine in Goshen, where two other physicians, Doctor John Gale and Doctor Pierson, had already located. He was very successful and was widely known as a surgeon. He married Miss Brown, by whom he had two sons and three daughters. In 1777 he was appointed lieutenant colonel of the Goshen regiment of militia under General Allison, and in 1778 was appointed surrogate of Orange County, which office he held when he lost his life at Minisink.

Captain John Wood, of Colonel Tusten's regiment, was captured in the battle of Minisink. Brant spared his life, reportedly because he saw Wood give a Masonic sign and was himself a Mason. Wood was taken captive and transported to a Mohawk village in Upper Canada. He left a journal of events that discussed the life and character of Brant.

Noah Webster, most notable for his work on An American Dictionary of the English Language, which later became part of the Merriam-Webster Dictionary, established and taught at school in Goshen called The Farmers' Hall Academy from 1782-1783. This academy is also noted for having been attended by former secretary of state William H. Seward. The original two-room brick structure of the academy now sits within the Goshen Town Hall, as described by the Historical Marker located outside the building in the center of the Village of Goshen.

=== 19th century ===
On July 22, 1822, the village of Goshen erected a monument to the dead of the Minisink battle. The remains of those men were gathered from the battlefield for burial in a mass grave marked by the monument. On July 22, 1862, a more elaborate monument was dedicated to these men. The funds were bequeathed in the will of Dr. Merritt H. Cash, of Minisink.

The current county courthouse in Goshen was constructed in 1841 and reflects the Greek Revival style in architecture. This is prevalent among buildings of a similar age in the Town and was popular for many county courthouses.

Goshen's First Presbyterian Church was constructed in 1720. In the colonial era, public hangings were conducted at the tree located just outside the church The church's steeple, more than 8 stories tall, towers over the historic center of the town. As late as 1890, the church continued to be the tallest structure in the county, visible from miles away. The church connects to a series of tunnels under the town. No one knows their original purpose. (A drone video of the church can be seen here: The First Presbyterian Church.)

Horse racing was popular in Goshen and other towns. Competitors raced horses on the roads from 1783, at the end of the Revolution. What is now known as Goshen Historic Track opened in 1838 and is the oldest half-mile track in the world. It was originally opened as a 1/3rd-mile circle around a circus ground, which was then succeeded by multiple iterations including a square track until the current half-mile oval was constructed in 1873. It is also "the oldest continuously operated horse racing track in the country" and has been designated as a National Historic Landmark. This region was important in the development of harness racing, and owners bred horses to excel in this sport. On June 24, 1873, President Ulysses S. Grant visited the town, staying in a local house and watching racing from a barn on the property.

After the American Civil War began, Goshen was the site for Camp Wickham, which held volunteers raised in Goshen in the summer of 1862. The 124th Regiment of Volunteers was mustered into federal service in Goshen on September 5, 1862, serving nearly three years. They mustered out at Washington's Headquarters in Newburgh, New York on June 14, 1865. The soldiers of this regiment fought in the Appomattox Campaign, and were present at the Confederate surrender at Appomattox Courthouse.

=== 20th century to present ===
In 2007, Michael Kohn, an 18-year-old Goshen Volunteer firefighter, started a fire that destroyed a house at 113 Webster Ave. Kohn pleaded guilty to arson, admitting also to starting fires in another house, a barn and a vehicle within a short period. He said that he had been struggling with depression. He was sentenced to five to fifteen years in prison.

In 2014, Devin Giordano and Jennifer Molyneaux murdered 81-year-old Helen Mills in her Goshen home, after breaking in to steal money for drugs. The pair pleaded guilty to second-degree murder in 2015, and Giordano pleaded guilty to other counts, including arson and robbery. Giordano was sentenced to 20 years to life for the murder.

=== Legoland ===
On May 29, 2021, Lego opened a Legoland theme park in Goshen, which is 60 miles north of New York City. The park opened on May 29, 2021, with protocols for protection from the COVID-19 pandemic and cost over $500 million to build. Built by Merlin Entertainment, the park contains a 250 room lego hotel, rides, and is spread across 500 acres of land. It was the first major theme park to open in the Northeast in 40 years. The park is estimated to have 10,000 visitors a day and contain more than 15,000 lego models.

==== Controversy ====
From the moment Goshen was identified as a home for the park, the company was met with pushback from local community members and faced constant controversy. Beginning in 2017, locals identified as "Concerned Citizens for the Hudson Valley" met at the Legoland welcome center to protest the park's construction, complaining about the lack of transparency and the presence of "behind the scenes" meetings. In November 2017, residents filed a suit in the Orange County Supreme Court to block the construction of the park. They argued that the Goshen town board fast-tracked the approval and construction of the park understanding that many Goshen residents would disapprove of the park's construction.

In October 2021, the New York Times published an article highlighting the controversy around the park and the many complaints of town locals. The article described how state inspectors cited Legoland for 67 environmental violations which resulted in fines totaling more than $600,000. The article also highlighted the many political battles that took place during town halls and outside many of the town's popular establishment. Many residents argued that they moved to Goshen for the local nature and the quiet atmosphere. However, during the early months of construction, many residents filed complaints of noise and topsoil runoff. Officials noted that the park would pay $88 million over 20 years, a fee for every ticket sold, taxes on its sales and revenue, and about $61 million towards Goshen schools for two decades.

== Geography ==
According to the United States Census Bureau, the town has a total area of 44 square miles (113.9 km^{2}), of which 43.8 square miles (113.6 km^{2}) is land and 0.1 square mile (.3 km^{2}) (.27%) is water.

Goshen is bordered on the north by the town of Wallkill, to the northeast by the town of Hamptonburgh, on the east by the town of Blooming Grove, to the southeast by the town of Chester, on the south by the town of Warwick, and to the west by the town of Wawayanda.

== Demographics ==
Historical population
Census	Pop.	Note	%±
1790	2,448		—
1820	3,441		—
1830	3,661		6.4%
1840	3,889		6.2%
1850	3,149		−19.0%
1860	3,480		10.5%
1870	3,903		12.2%
1880	4,387		12.4%
1890	5,021		14.5%
1900	4,564		−9.1%
1910	5,149		12.8%
1920	5,016		−2.6%
1930	5,182		3.3%
1940	5,697		9.9%
1950	5,832		2.4%
1960	6,835		17.2%
1970	8,393		22.8%
1980	10,463		24.7%
1990	11,500		9.9%
2000	12,913		12.3%
2010	13,687		6.0%
2020	14,571		6.5%
U.S. Decennial Census 2020

As of the 2010 United States census, there were 12,913 people, 4,074 households, and 2,912 families residing in the town. The population density was 313.6 inhabitants per square mile (121.1/km^{2}). There were 4,320 housing units at an average density of 98.5 per square mile (38.0/km^{2}). The racial makeup of the town was 81.6% white, 6.6% black or African American, .16% Native American, 4.5% Asian, .04% Pacific Islander, 1.82% from other races, and 3.3% from two or more races. Hispanic or Latino of any race were 12.9% of the population. Goshen is also home to a Yiddish-speaking community, members of which operate several farms in the area.

There were 4,074 households, out of which 35.4% had children under the age of 18 living with them, 60.2% were married couples living together, 8.1% had a female householder with no husband present, and 28.5% were non-families. 24.4% of all households were made up of individuals, and 11.9% had someone living alone who was 65 years of age or older. The average household size was 2.73 and the average family size was 3.27.

In the town, the population was spread out, with 21.4% under the age of 18, 7.2% from 18 to 24, 28.5% from 25 to 44, 23% from 45 to 64, and 16.9% who were 65 years of age or older. The median age was 39 years. The gender makeup of the town was relatively equal, as for every 100 females, there were 100.4 males, and for every 100 females age 18 and over, there were 96.9 males.

The median income for a household in the town was $60,066, and the median income for a family was $71,497. Males had a median income of $50,768 versus $32,648 for females. The per capita income for the town was $24,275. About 2.7% of families and 4.5% of the population were below the poverty line, including 3.1% of those under age 18 and 8.8% of those age 65 or over.

== Communities and locations in the town of Goshen ==
Old stone schoolhouse near Finnegans Corner

- Big Island – a location near the southern town line.
- Durlandville – a hamlet on County Road 6 in the southwestern part of the town.
- Finnegans Corner – a hamlet north of Florida on NY-17A.
- Florida – a small part of the village of Florida is on the southern town line, located in route NY-17A.
- Goshen – the village of Goshen is the county seat. It is located in the northern part of the town. Conjoined NY-17 and US-6 pass south of it.
- Goshen Hills – a location east of Finnegans Corner.
- Howells – a hamlet south of Goshen village, served by NY-17A.
- Maple Island – a location south of Durlandville.
- Otter Kill – a hamlet southeast of Goshen village, served by NY-17.
- Pellets Island – a community near the western town line and served by County Road 37.

== Transportation ==
U.S. Route 6 and New York State Route 17 pass through as a main arterial road through the town.

Into the 1950s, long distance Erie Railroad trains Erie Limited and Lake Cities between Chicago and Jersey City, New Jersey made stops in Goshen's station.

== Notable people ==
- Rowena Granice Steele (1824–1901), American performer and publisher
- Willie "The Lion" Smith (1879-1979), stride jazz pianist
- Dale Memmelaar, (1937-2009) NFL Guard/ Tackle, (played for the Cowboys, Browns, Cardinals, and Colts from 1959-1967)
- Florence Babb (born 1951), professor
- Isaac V. D. Heard, Minnesota lawyer and politician
- Michelle Lee, editor in chief for Allure
- Hartley Sawyer, actor
- General Martin Dempsey (born 1952), former Army chief of staff, and former chairman of the Joint Chiefs of Staff.
- Chris Caffery, guitarist, Savatage and Trans-Siberian Orchestra
- Sean Corr, racing driver
- Emily DiDonato, model
