= Jennie Augusta Brownscombe =

American painter (1850–1936)

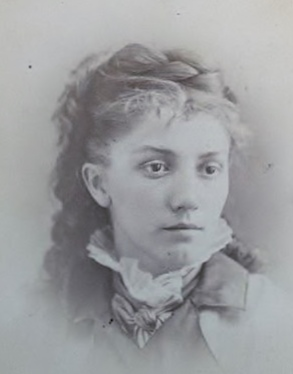
- Born: December 10, 1850; Honesdale, Pennsylvania
- Died: August 5, 1936 (aged 85); Bayside, New York
- Resting place: Dyberry Cemetery, Honesdale, Pennsylvania; 41°34′58.62″N 75°15′26.57″W
- Education: Cooper Institute School of Design for Women, National Academy of Design, Art Students League of New York, private study in Paris
- Known for: Painting
- Notable work: The First Thanksgiving, Love's Young Dream
- Movement: Genre, Colonial Revival, New Woman illustrator
- Awards: At the National Academy of Design, she won: honorable mention; first prize Elliott Medal in the Antique School; first prize Suydam Medal in the Life studies school

Jennie Augusta Brownscombe (December 10, 1850 – August 5, 1936) was an American painter, designer, etcher, commercial artist, and illustrator. Brownscombe studied art for years in the United States and in Paris. She was a founding member, student and teacher at the Art Students League of New York. She made genre paintings, including revolutionary and colonial American history, most notably The First Thanksgiving held at Pilgrim Hall in Plymouth, Massachusetts. She sold the reproduction rights to more than 100 paintings, and images of her work have appeared on prints, calendars and greeting cards. Her works are in many public collections and museums. In 1899 she was described by New York World as "one of America's best artists".

== Personal life ==
Brownscombe was born December 10, 1850 in a 1 1/2-story farmhouse near Irving Cliff in Honesdale, Pennsylvania, the only child of a farmer from Devonshire, England, William Brownscombe, and American Elvira Kennedy Brownscombe. Her father is believed to have emigrated to the United States about 1840 and built the home she was born and raised in. Her mother, Elvira Kennedy Brownscombe, was a descendant of a Mayflower passenger and Isaac Stearns who arrived in the colonies in 1630. During her life, Jennie Brownscombe was an active member of the Daughters of the American Revolution, the Mayflower Descendants and the Historic and Scenic Preservation Society.

Her mother, a talented writer and artist, fostered Brownscombe's interest in poetry and art. She won awards at the Wayne County Fair for her work when she was a high school student.

After her father's death in 1868, Brownscombe earned a living teaching high school in Honesdale and creating book and magazine illustrations, which were inspired by the streams and fields around her home and nearby Irving Cliff. She was described as "slender, with a thin face in which large brown eyes and a dimpled chin were distinctive, and reserved in manner. She lived simply with one companion or servant.

Brownscombe studied art in New York and then in Paris in 1882. She returned to the United States and an eye injury prevented her from painting until 1884 when she worked in a New York City studio. She often visited her mother in Honesdale, until her death in 1891.

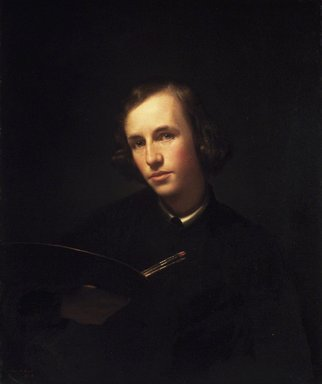
George Henry Hall, Self-Portrait, 1845, Brooklyn Museum of Art, gift of Jennie Brownscombe

Between 1885 and 1896 Brownscombe spent the winters in Rome Italy, where she met artist George Henry Hall with who was her companion and mentor. In the summers they shared a studio in Palenville in the New York Catskill Mountains from about 1908 until Hall died in 1913. Hall "deeply influenced Brownscombe's sense of style, color and craftsmanship." When he died, Hall left his home and property in the Catskills to Brownscombe, including the painting "Danaë and the Golden Shower" by John Smibert. Its location was unknown as of 1969. After Hall's death, Brownscombe spent the winters in Bayside and New York City and the summer in the Catskills.

She donated a wide range of works of art to the Brooklyn Museum of Art. By 1912 she had donated a self-portrait made by George Henry Hall, a watercolor painting made by Hall of a Pompeiian fresco, 18th-century brocades, and a sketchbook of Sanford Robinson Gifford. By 1917 she had donated other textiles, a silver filigree brooch, and a 17th-century Flemish tapestry that depicted the marriage of Alexander the Great and Roxana. She also donated a George Henry Hall sketchbook, a 15th-century textile, and a pair of Etruscan earrings.

== Education ==
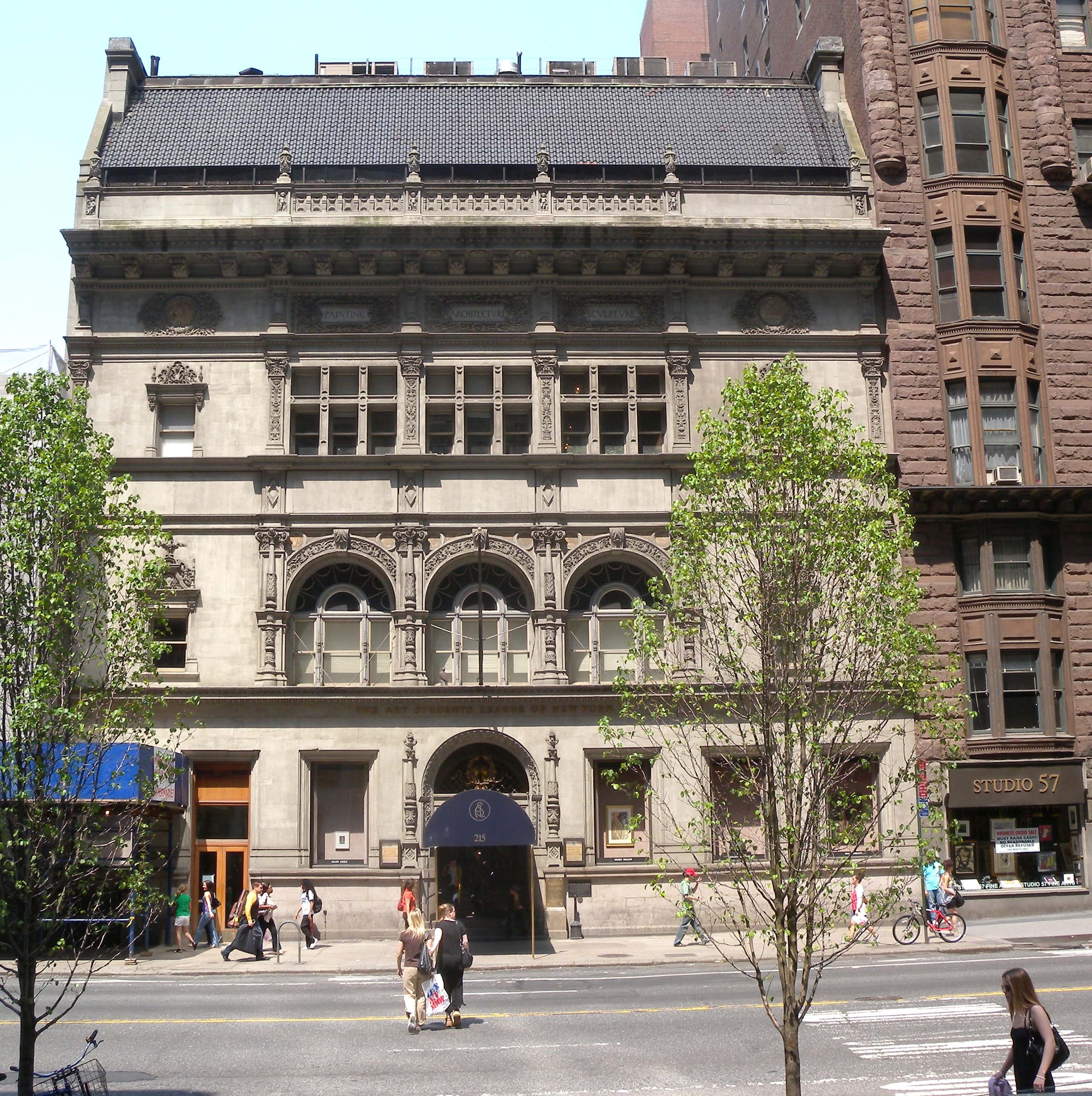
Art Students League of New York Building, West 57th Street, New York, New York. Brownscome was a founding member, student and instructor at the school.

In 1871, she went to New York City, studied under Victor Nehlig and graduated from the Cooper Institute School of Design for Women in 1872. She studied at the National Academy of Design for a couple of years under Lemuel Wilmarth until she became a founding member and student of the Art Students League of New York. She made illustrations, wrote short pieces about art for the newspapers, and taught art classes at the Art Students League to defray tuition and other expenses and studied there until 1878, when she continued her studies at the National Academy of Design until 1881. At the Academy Brownscombe won honorable mention, the first prize Elliott Medal in the Antique School and the first prize Suydam Medal in the Life studies school. After completing her studies at the Academy, she traveled to Europe and studied in Paris under Henry Mosler, a genre painter in his Brittany and Paris studios.

== Career ==
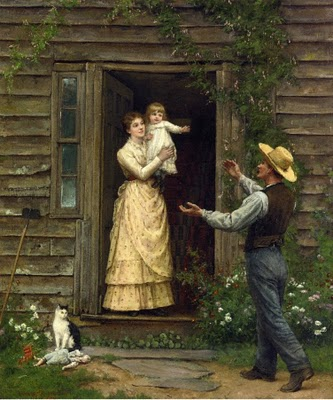
Jennie Augusta Brownscombe, The Homecoming, 1885

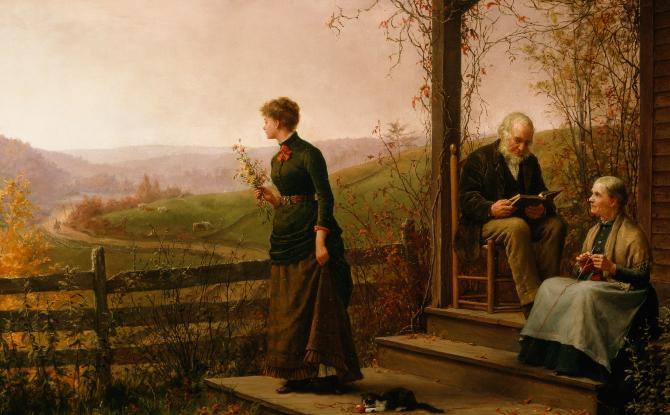
Jennie Augusta Brownscombe, Love's Young Dream, 1887, National Museum of Women in the Arts

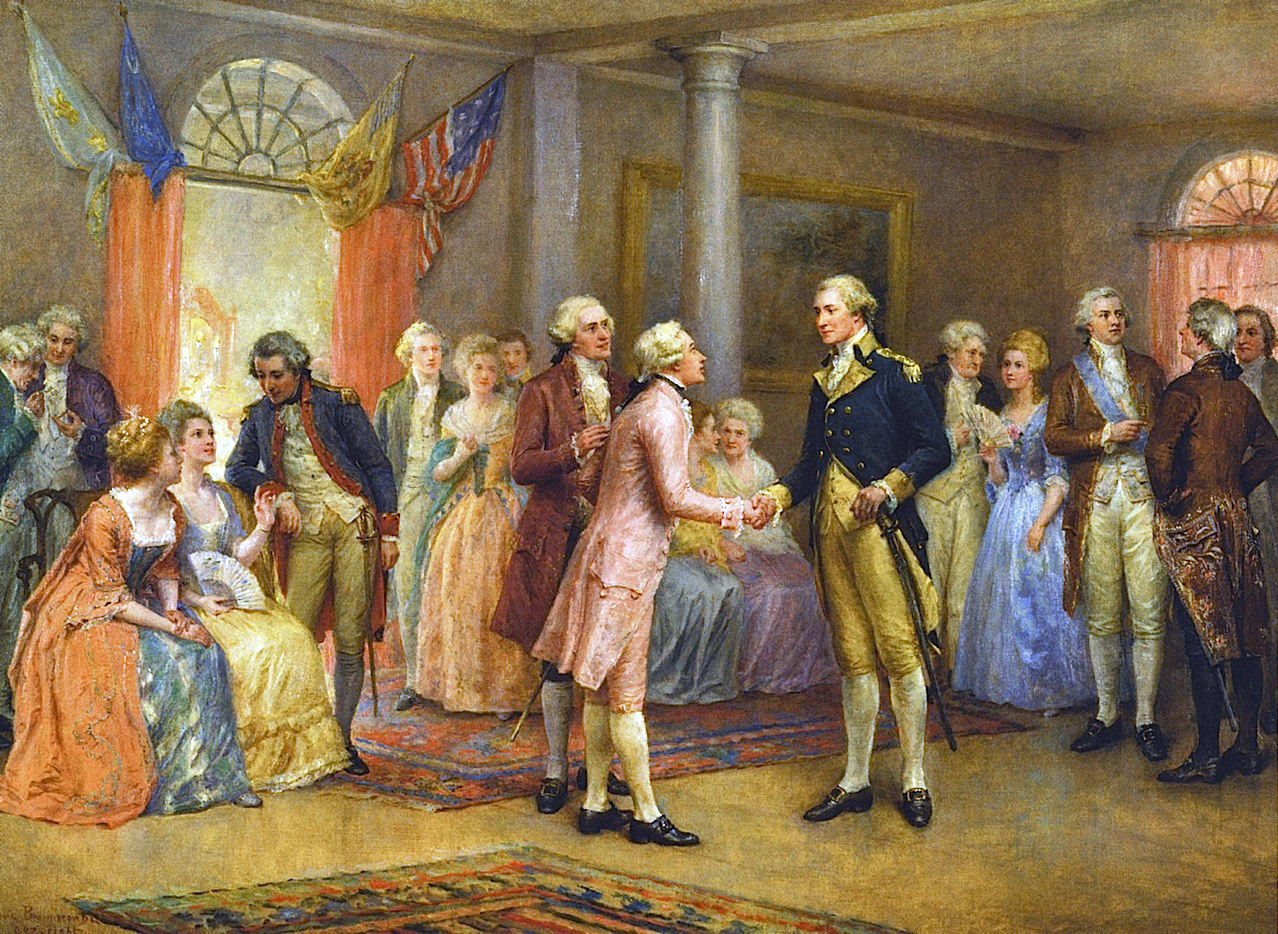
Jennie Augusta Brownscombe, Washington Greeting Lafayette at Mount Vernon, oil painting, early 20th century, Lafayette College, Easton, Pennsylvania

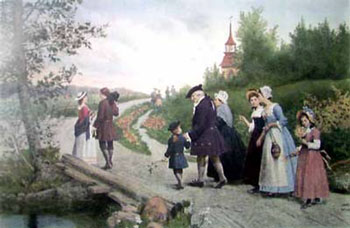
Jennie Augusta Brownscombe, Sunday Morning in Sleepy Hollow, by 1902

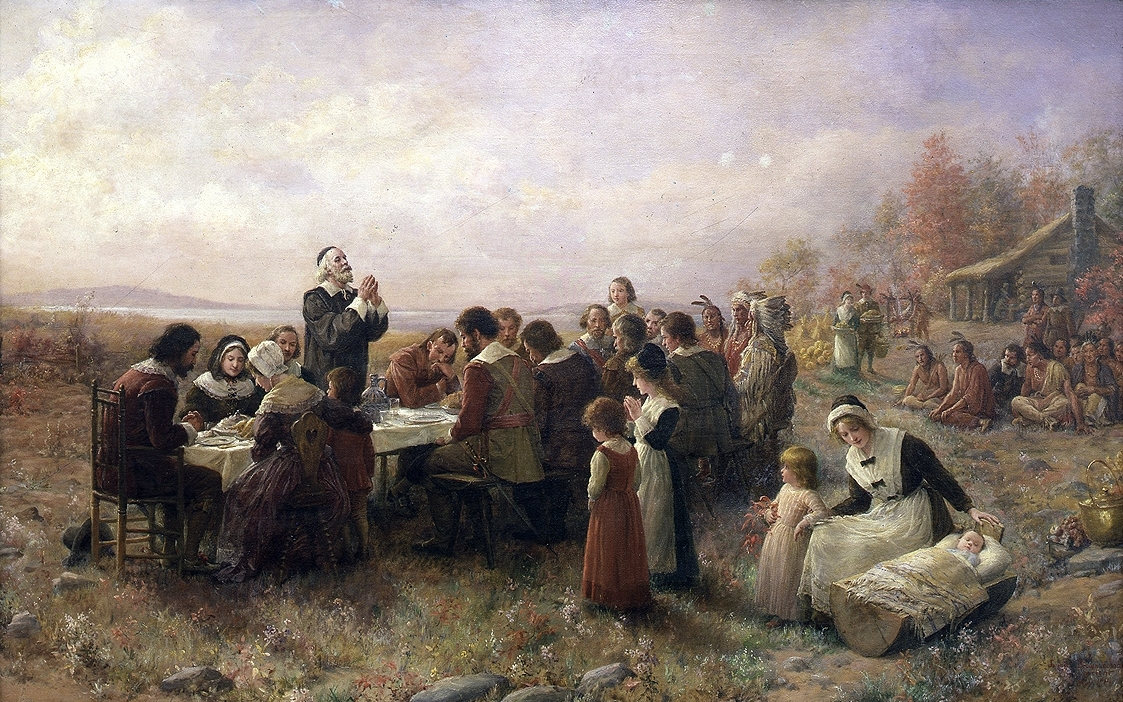
Jennie Augusta Brownscombe, The First Thanksgiving at Plymouth, 1914, Pilgrim Hall Museum, Plymouth, Massachusetts

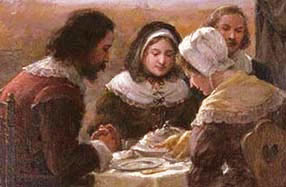
Jennie Augusta Brownscombe, Detail of The First Thanksgiving, 1914

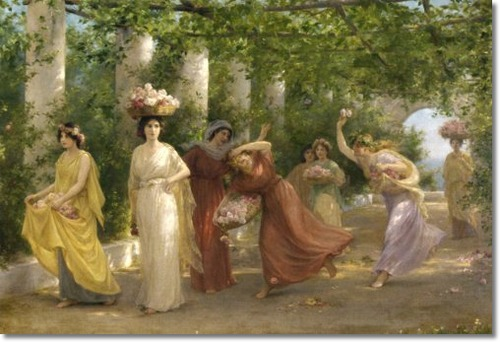
Jennie Augusta Brownscombe, Maidens and Roses, 1906

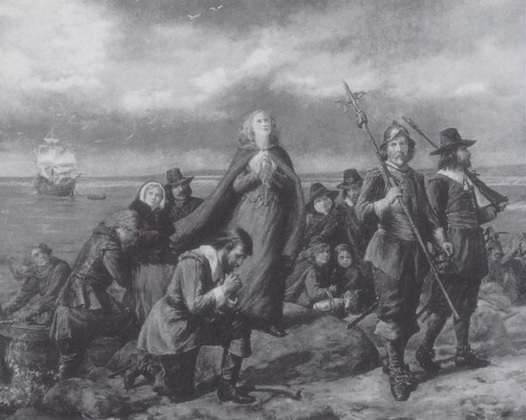
Jennie Brownscombe, The Landing of the Pilgrims, black-and-white copy of a lithograph, c. 1920

=== Overview ===
Brownscome worked as a water color and oil painter, illustrator, etcher, designer, and commercial artist. She made portraits and genre paintings. Art historian Eleanor Tufts said that Brownscombe had a "penchant for narrative painting rendered with realism." Her paintings, which depicted both emotional scenes and historical ones, were exhibited in New York, Philadelphia, Chicago, and London. She sold the reproduction rights to more than 100 of her works, which were produced for greeting cards, calendars and prints in the late 19th century. Some of her popular paintings are the "idealized vision of traditional rural life and family" in Love's Young Dream (1887) and The First Thanksgiving at Plymouth (1914), in the collection of the Pilgrim Hall Museum at Plymouth, Massachusetts. In 1899 she was described by New York World as "one of America's best artists".

She was a member of the New York Women Painters Society, American Artists Professional League, National Arts Club, and the Municipal Art Society.

=== Genre paintings ===
Her first sold painting was Grandmother's Treasures, made in 1876. Exhibited in the 1876 National Academy of Design show, it was described as a "large and cleverly painted interior... with figures." The painting she made in 1879, The New Scholar, is listed in the book, Index to Reproductions of American Paintings: A Guide to Pictures Occurring in More Than Eight Hundred Books. Although she primarily made genre paintings, she also made portraits and experimented with Impressionism, such as in the 1885 painting, Apple Orchards in May where she dotted green and white paint "to give the impression of the wispy, lovely bloom of apple trees in springtime."

=== "New Woman" illustrator ===
As educational opportunities were made more available in the 19th century, women artists became part of professional enterprises, including founding their own art associations. Artwork made by women was considered to be inferior, and to help overcome that stereotype women became "increasingly vocal and confident" in promoting women's work, and thus became part of the emerging image of the educated, modern and freer "New Woman". Artists "played crucial roles in representing the New Woman, both by drawing images of the icon and exemplyfying this emerging type through their own lives." In the late 19th century and early 20th century about 88% of the subscribers of 11,000 magazines and periodicals were women. As women entered the artist community, publishers hired women to create illustrations that depict the world through a woman's perspective. Brownscombe's work expressed a sentimental viewpoint, as in Love's Young Dream and a feminine perspective is evident in The First Thanksgiving at Plymouth which depicts a woman in the foreground with her two children. Other successful illustrators were Jessie Wilcox Smith, Rose O'Neill, Elizabeth Shippen Green, and Violet Oakley.

She sold the reproduction rights to more than 100 of her works, which were produced for greeting cards, calendars and prints in the late 19th century. About 1882 reproductions of her paintings became popular and printers sought out Brownscombe for her paintings, which were well-made but also became "stilted and repetitious".

In Love's Young Dream, Brownscombe depicts a mother looking on with fond interest at a woman whose attention is transfixed towards an approaching man on horseback, her father intent on his reading. "Brownscombe contrasts the right-hand side of the picture, where all three figures have been placed, with the left, where an unencumbered view of the landscape stretches back to mist-shrouded hills." Washington Post art critic Paul Richard commented that the 1887 painting of a young woman, with childhood behind her, yearns for making a home with a man, rather than a career. He said, "It is not easy to imagine – harem scenes aside – a less liberated picture."

=== Colonial Revival ===
Brownscombe was among a group of artists of the Colonial Revival Movement that admired colonial heroes like George Washington and colonial history, inspired by the 1876 centennial. Other artists included Howard Pyle, Jean Leon Gerome Ferris, Henry Alexander Ogden, Edward Percy Moran, and John Ward Dunsmore. Their works, inspired by earlier artwork and George Washington biographies, were publicized in color in books, magazines, calendars and other commercial products, utilizing contemporary advances in lithographic printing. Many were also sold into private collections. She was also becoming more aware of the colonial roots of her mother's family. Of the paintings she made of historic figures, she made 20 or more paintings of George Washington, some of which were reproduced by Gerlach Barklow Company, including the Marriage of George and Martha Washington and The First Meeting of Colonel Washington and Mrs. Curtis, which were purchased from Brownscombe in 1919 and 1920. She made paintings of other colonial scenes in the 1890s; Between 1895 and 1897 she made The Peace Ball which depicted Washington introducing his mother to Gilbert du Motier, Marquis de Lafayette and Jean-Baptiste Donatien de Vimeur, comte de Rochambeau. She painted scenes of Dolley Madison hosting a ball, the Liberty Bell being rung by a man, and Betsy Ross sewing the American flag.

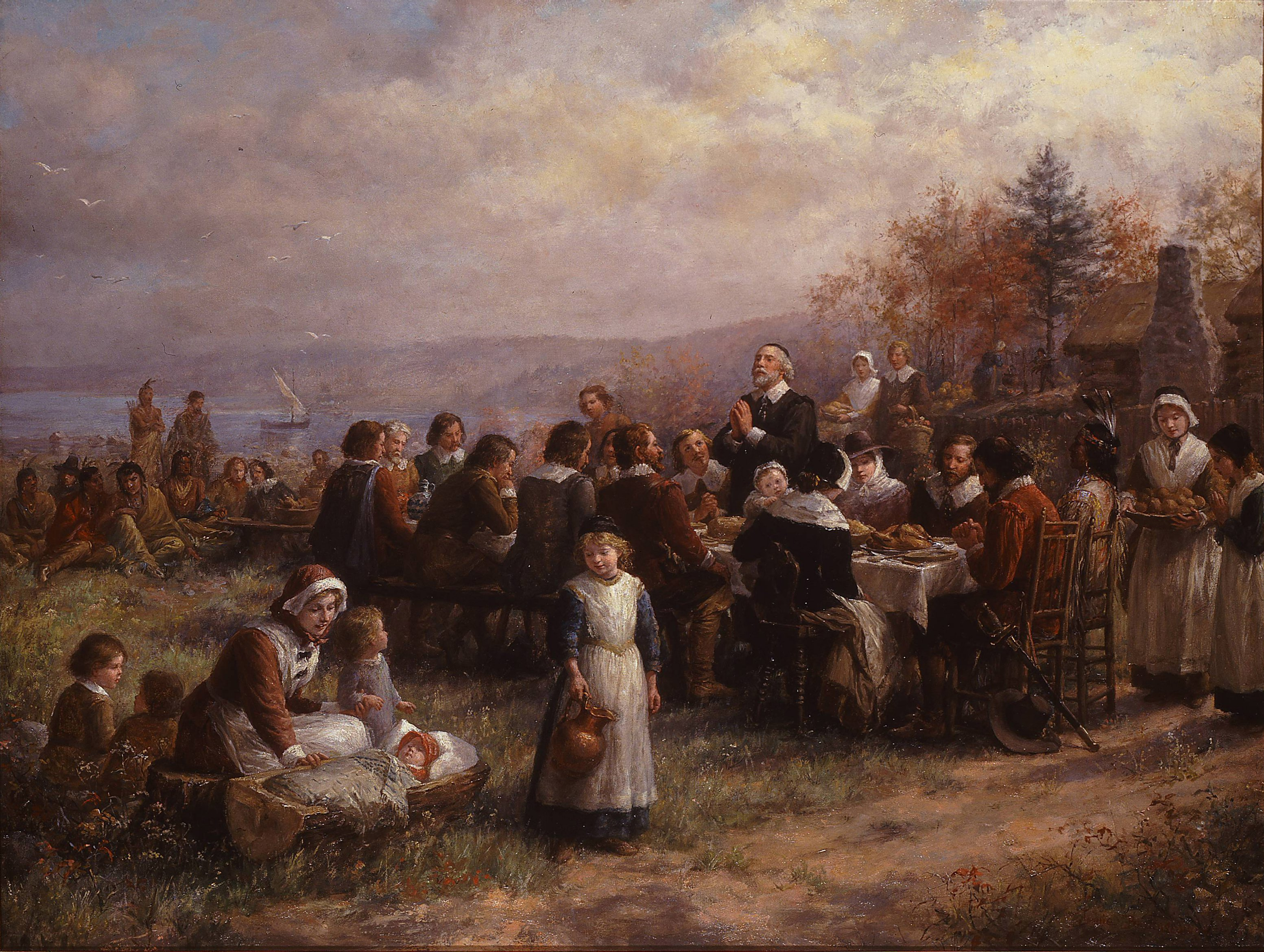
Jennie Augusta Brownscombe, Thanksgiving at Plymouth, 1925, National Museum of Women in the Arts

The First Thanksgiving,1914, depicts the historic event when colonialists and Native Americans, led by Massasoit, gathered in 1621 to celebrate the bounty of their first harvest in accordance with an English tradition. That 1914 Thanksgiving painting has a few historical inaccuracies: the Native Americans are dressed as Plains Indians and the presence of the log cabin. Pointedly, the anachronistic Plains Indians headdresses depicted in her 1914 painting were not repeated when Brownscombe recreated the First Thanksgiving scene in her 1925 painting "Thanksgiving at Plymouth".

She made a painting of the landing at Plymouth Rock about 1920 entitled Landing of the Pilgrims with a woman of "Botticelli quality" as the central figure in a pyramid shaped composition. According to author and historian John D. Seelye, "Hers is a tender presence guarded by the advancing figures of Miles Standish with pikestaff and sword and a Pilgrim (probably John Carver) with a blunderbuss, but it reminds us that by the tercentenary year women in America were gathering political strength."

=== Portraits ===
In the 1920s she made portraits of federal Circuit Court of Appeals judges, Rutgers University trustee William Hopkins Leupp and Flushing Hospital physician and distant relative Dr. Charles Story. Brownscombe created illustrations for Harpers Weekly, Scribner and Pauline Bouvé's Tales of the Mayflower Children, which was published in 1927.

=== Later years ===
She completed Children Playing in the Orchard for Lincoln School in Honesdale in 1932 after having a stroke. Brownscombe painted until 1934 when she was 84 years of age. She died August 5, 1936 in Bayside, New York and was buried in the Glen Dyberry Cemetery in Honesdale next to her parents. She had never married or had any children.

=== Legacy ===
Her works continued to be sold successfully in the United States and Europe during the Great Depression. In 1982, she was among the "Legendary Ladies" of the Northeast Mountains Region, a program sponsored by Pennsylvania Governor Ed Rendell. The women included in this group are described as follows: "Throughout the commonwealth, there are hundreds of places where women have made history--women who have fought against stereotypes, prejudice and an abundance of obstacles, becoming a part of Pennsylvania's heritage." The Wayne County Historical Society in Honesdale, Pennsylvania held a retrospective exhibit of her works in 1996. In early 2011 a solo exhibition of her work was held at the Hope Horn Gallery in Scranton, Pennsylvania. Some of the paintings from the exhibit came from the collection of the Wayne County Historical Society, Pennsylvania. On loan from the Pilgrim Hall was The First Thanksgiving and the National Museum of Women in the Arts loaned Love's Young Dream.

Businesslike while painting, sure of her technique, she ignored criticism, praise, changes in the art world, and demands of society; she called her art and its accompanying research "great fun".

— Florence Woolsey Hazzard

== Collections ==
Brownscombe's works are in the collections of:

- Cornell Fine Arts Museum, Rollins College, Winter Park, Florida
- Franklin National Bank, Franklin Square, New York
- Gilcrease Museum, Tulsa, Oklahoma
- Lafayette College, Easton, Pennsylvania
- Lincoln School, Honesdale, Pennsylvania
- Museum of Art, Colby College, Waterville, Maine
- National Museum of Women in the Arts
- Newark Museum, New Jersey
- Pilgrim Hall in Plymouth
- Wayne County Historical Society.
- Library of Congress, Washington

== Works ==
- A Frolic, watercolor painting, by 1876
- A Rest by the Way, black and white, by 1879
- A Spring Day, painting
- A Walk in the Woods, painting
- A Welcome Step, by 1902
- An Argument, oil painting
- Apple Orchards in May, oil painting, Museum of Art, Colby College, Waterville, Maine
- At the County Fair, crayon drawing, by 1875
- Awaiting the Victor, by 1892
- Berry Pickers, oil painting, Private Collection, Cleveland, Ohio, sold at Bonhams May 3, 2017
- Blossom Time, painting, 1888
- Child with Flowers in Apron (Mrs. Bud Dodge), watercolor, late 19th century, Wayne County Historical Society
- Colonial Children and School, oil painting, early 20th century
- Cora Sears at Age Five, oil painting, c. 1875, Wayne County Historical Society, Honesdale, Pennsylvania
- Crown, Scepter, and Kingdom, watercolor painting, by 1875
- Dawn's Early Light, Francis Scott Key, Baltimore Harbor, oil painting, early 20th century
- Day-dreams, painting, by 1874
- Dr. O.W. Holmes' "Elsie Venner", painting
- Easter Morn, oil painting
- First Thanksgiving at Plymouth (study), c. 1910
- First Thanksgiving at Plymouth, 1914, Pilgrim Hall Museum
- George Hall-Brownscombe Studio, watercolor, c. 1912, Wayne County Historical Society
- Girl in Wheat, oil painting, before 1898, Wayne County Historical Society, Honesdale, Pennsylvania
- Goose Girl, oil painting, 1882, Lincoln School, Honesdale, Pennsylvania
- Grecian Artist, by 1894
- Guinevere at Camelot, watercolor, Raydon Gallery, New York New York
- Happy Childhood, painting, by 1878
- Homecoming, oil painting, 1885
- In an Art Gallery, oil painting, late 19th century, Lincoln School, Honesdale, Pennsylvania
- In Anticipation of the Invitation, 1888
- In the Garden, oil painting, sold at Sotheby's 1980
- Joy of Their Old Age, oil painting, before 1885
- Love Letter, painting, sold at Christie's 1982
- Love's Young Dream, oil on canvas, 1887, National Museum of Women in the Arts
- Marriage of George and Martha Washington
- Materfamilias, watercolor, by 1875
- Maternal Admonitions, watercolor painting, by 1876
- May Day, watercolor, 1896, Newark Museum, New Jersey
- Medication, by 1901
- Minute Men Called to Arms, oil painting, c. 1912
- Papa's Come Home!, painting
- Peaceful Mount Vernon, oil painting, c. 1905
- Portrait of a Young Lady, Kate Miner, oil painting, late 19th century, Wayne County Historical Society
- Scenes from Honesdale, Pennsylvaniam oil painting, c. 1900
- Songs of Love, by 1892
- Story of the Battle, by 1894
- Summer Flowers, watercolor, by 1879
- Sunday Morning in Sleepy Hollow, by 1902
- Sunday Morning, oil painting, 1882, Wayne County Historical Society, Honesdale, Pennsylvania
- The Choir Boys, oil painting, Cornell Fine Arts Museum, Rollins College, Winter Park, Florida
- The Coquette, oil painting, sold at Sotheby's 1984
- The Event of the Season, Elsie Venner, Chap. 19, painting, by 1874
- The First Meeting of Colonel Washington and Mrs. Curtis, four-color print made from a c. 1919 painting, Gerlach Barklow Company, Joliet Illinois
- The Gleaners, by 1902
- The Great Convention, oil painting, c. 1910, Franklin National Bank, Franklin Square, New York
- The Last Look, painting, by 1884
- The New Scholar, oil on canvas, 1897, Gilcrease Museum, University of Tulsa
- The Parson's Bride
- The Peace Ball, oil on canvas, 1897, Newark Museum, New Jersey
- Venus Mirror, by 1892
- Washington Bidding Farewell to His Generals
- Washington Greeting Lafayette at Mount Vernon, oil painting, early 20th century, Lafayette College, Easton, Pennsylvania
- Washington Taking Leave of his Officers, oil painting, early 20th century, Lafayette College, Easton, Pennsylvania
- Washingtons at Monticello, oil painting, early 20th century. Mary and George Washington with Thomas Jefferson, Wayne County Historical Society, Honesdale, Pennsylvania
- Washington's Home Life at Newbergh Headquarters, oil painting, early 20th century
- Woman at Spinning Wheel, painting
- Yes Mother, in a minute!, painting, by 1874
- You Can't Go, black and white, by 1879
