= Susan Dickinson =

Susan Dickinson may refer to:

- Susan E. Dickinson (1832–1915), American journalist
- Susan Huntington Gilbert Dickinson (1830–1913), writer, poet, traveler, and editor
