= George Henry Hall =

George Henry Hall may refer to:

- George Hall, 1st Viscount Hall (1881–1965), British Labour politician
- George Henry Hall (artist) (1825–1913), American still-life and landscape artist
