= Susan E. Dickinson =

American journalist

Susan Evelyn Dickinson
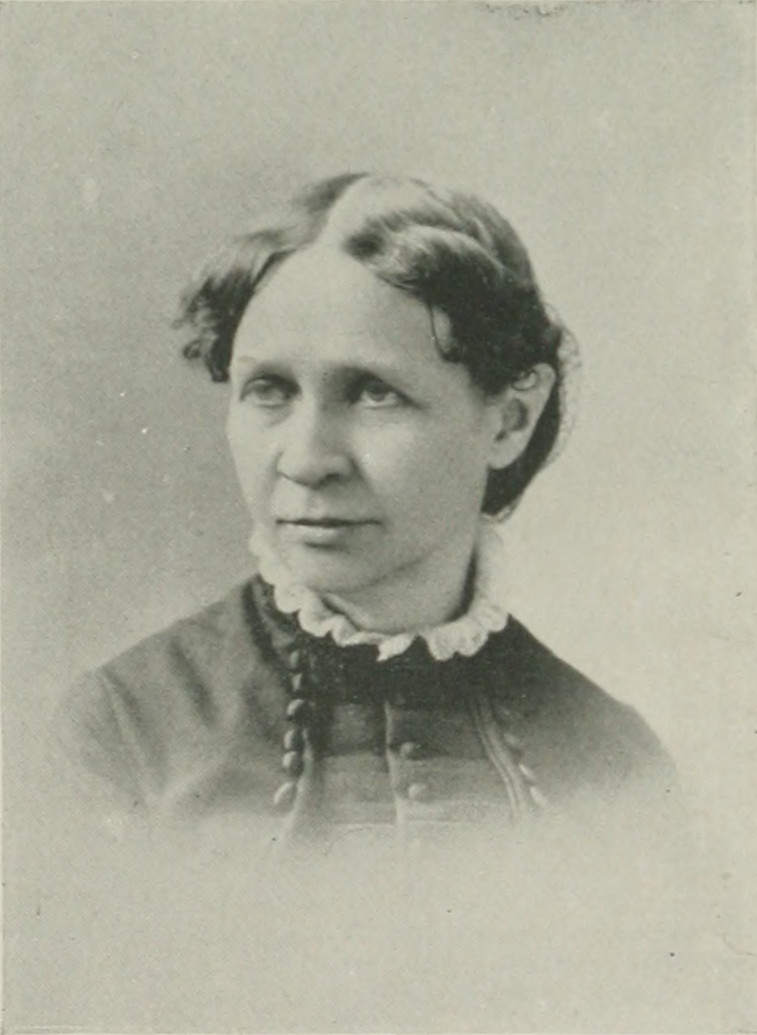
- Susan E Dickinson, circa 1893
- Born: August 25, 1832; Philadelphia, Pennsylvania
- Died: November 16, 1915 (aged 83); Scranton, Pennsylvania
- Resting place: Glen Dyberry Cemetery in Honesdale, Pennsylvania; 41.582°N 75.257°W
- Occupation: Journalist
- Known for: Articles about the coal mining industry and women's rights. Having committed her sister to an insane asylum.

Susan E. Dickinson (August 25, 1832 – November 16, 1915) was an American journalist and the older sister of lecturer Anna Elizabeth Dickinson.

She wrote for a number of New York, Philadelphia, and regional Pennsylvania newspapers. In her early career, she contributed essays and was a correspondent during the American Civil War. She is noted for her articles about the coal mining industry, particularly the management-labor strife during the late 19th century. She also wrote about women's rights, suffrage, art, and history. She became an associated editor of The Scranton Truth.

Dickinson was the sister of 19th-century lecturer Anna Elizabeth Dickinson, with whom Susan lived in at the height of Anna's fame. When Dickinson developed a stable career as a journalist, Anna moved into her house. During that time, she was attacked by Anna. Dickinson had her committed to the Danville State Hospital. Anna was then removed to Interpines sanitarium. Anna sued her sister and newspapers. After having won her legal battle, the sisters never spoke to each other again.

== Early life ==
Susan Evelyn Dickinson, born on August 25, 1832 in Wernersville, Pennsylvania, was the oldest child of Quakers and abolitionists John and Mary Dickinson. She had three brothers—John, Edwin, and Samuel—and her youngest sibling was her sister, Anna Elizabeth Dickinson. Her father, an abolitionist and merchant, died of a heart attack in 1844, leaving the family financially challenged.

Dickinson attended the Friends school in Philadelphia, after her family moved to the city. She also attended Westtown boarding school. She was a talented pianist.

== Career ==
Dickinson became a teacher at the Friends school at the age of 16. She taught in the Philadelphia public schools beginning when she was 17 years of age. Although, she did not enjoy being an educator, she led classrooms into the 1860s.

Interested in writing, she published poetry in the Boston True Flag, The Saturday Evening Post, and journals by the beginning of the American Civil War. She used the pseudonyms "Ada Vernon, "Violet May", and "Effie Evergreen".

She also wrote essays that were published in New York Herald and The Philadelphia Press. During the war, she was the Washington, D.C. correspondent for the New York Tribune. She wrote biographies and obituaries for the New York Herald from 1874 to 1881 and her first book was a memoir of a friend.

After 1872, Susan worked in West Pittston, Pennsylvania, covering stories about the labor and management strife in the coal mining industry. She regularly visited local mines and breakers to perform research among the coal miners.

She took long trips up and down the valley in quest of information... pushing her way like a messenger of light among the grime and dust of coal breakers, the roar of machinery, or along the subterranean chambers of the mine... she feels it is her duty even in the ordinary pursuit of life to be doing good—righting some wrong, correcting some error, suggesting some reform by which men and women would be their better selves.

— History of Luzerne, Lackawanna, and Wyoming Counties, Pennsylvania

She also wrote about women's rights, the suffrage movement, art, and history by 1880. Her stories were published weekly in The Philadelphia Press, New York Graphic, and New York Herald newspapers. She also wrote for The Pittston Gazette, Scranton Times, The Wilkes-Barre Record, The Scranton Tribune, and the Boston Evening Traveller. She was said in the Wyoming Valley History (1880) to have done "more than any other writer to present to the world the bright and best side of life in the coal regions."

Dickinson wrote "Women in Journalism", which was published in 1891 in Women's Work in America by editor Annie Nathan Meyer and in a handout for the World's Columbian Exposition, entitled The National Exposition Souvenir: What America Owes to Women. In 1893, she was hired by The Scranton Truth as an associated editor. She also continued to write about a wide range of topics.

== Personal life ==
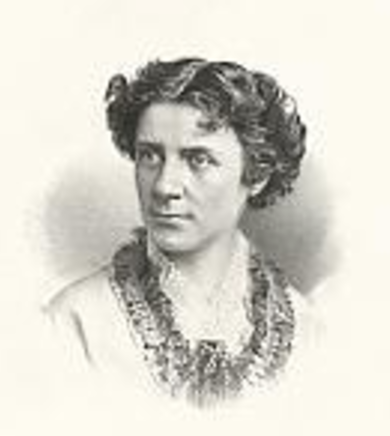
L. Schamer, Anna Elizabeth Dickinson, lithograph, 1870, taken from a sheet of Representative Women of the period

As a young woman, she was overshadowed by the success of her younger sister's career as a lecturer. When Anna purchased a house on Locust Street in Philadelphia, Dickinson became a caretaker for her mother and managed the household, while also writing essays for newspapers. She was described as "witty, intuitive and incisive in speech" by Susan B. Anthony, one of the people in Anna's social circle. Others that visited the Dickinson home were Henry Ward Beecher, Horace Greeley and Whitelaw Reid.

In the 1870s, Anna had difficulty making a career as a lecturer and at her attempts at acting. She had to sell her house. After 1872, Susan and her mother moved to West Pittston, Pennsylvania, where she was able to build a successful career as a journalist. Anna moved into her mother and sister's house in 1883, having had problems with mental instability and illness. She was not well received by the community, and she did not enjoy living in what she called a "duck-puddle of a country village". She particularly did not like gossip, but she provided fodder for her neighbors, due to her pretentious behavior and eccentric clothing.

On May 12, 1889, Dickinson's 95-year-old mother died in West Pittston, Pennsylvania. She was said to have been an invalid for years and cared for by her daughters, writer Susan and lecturer Anna. Mary remained a Quaker her entire life, but Susan converted to the Episcopal religion when she was a young woman. She often gave to charities in the area.

By 1891, Anna attacked Susan, became despondent, and had a nervous breakdown. Susan had her committed to the Danville State Hospital. (Note: The Citizen's Voice stated that Anna remained in Danville for four years, but was taken to Danville in February 1891, remained there a short time before she went to Interpines sanitarium and was giving lectures by late August that year.) Anna filed lawsuits in 1895 against the physicians and Dickinson for having her committed, and in 1897 was considered sane. The sisters never spoke again.

In 1893, Dickinson moved to Scranton, where she lived the remainder of her life. Dickinson died of pneumonia in Scranton on November 16, 1915, at 83 years of age. She was buried at the Glen Dyberry Cemetery in Honesdale, Pennsylvania.

Dickinson's brother, John, a Methodist minister and professor at Stanford University, died a few years before Dickinson. Her brother Samuel, who was an Episcopal minister, died before that. Anna was the sole-surviving sibling at Susan's death.
