= George Henry Hall (artist) =

American painter (1825-1913)

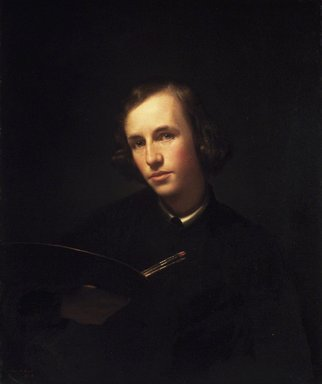
- George Henry Hall, Self-Portrait, 1845, Brooklyn Museum of Art
- Born: September 21, 1825; Boston
- Died: February 17, 1913 (aged 87); New York City
- Education: Düsseldorf Academy
- Known for: Painter, draughtsman, sculptor and print-maker
- Movement: Academic

George Henry Hall (1825–1913) was an American still-life and landscape artist. He studied art in Düsseldorf and Paris and he worked and lived in New York City, the Catskills of New York and in Europe. His works are in museum collections in the United States and Europe. Over the course of his career he sold 1,659 paintings.

== Early life ==
George Henry Hall was born on September 21, 1825, in Boston, Massachusetts, and raised in Manchester, New Hampshire. (Note: An American Art News obituary and the Smithsonian says he was born in Boston, Massachusetts, Arthur Adams, author of The Catskills: An Illustrated Historical Guide with Gazetteer, calls Hall a "native of New Hampshire". Dearinger notes that Hall said that he was born in Boston and raised in New Hampshire.) His father was a successful lumber dealer and his ancestors had come to the United States in the early 18th century from Ireland.

Hall attended public schools and studied art from 16 years of age. He joined a Boston art association, since there was no art school there, and met with its members in their studios to share critiques and encouragement. He also sent some of his works to New York's Art Union, where they were sold. Hall went to Europe with Eastman Johnson to study in 1849, funded by the sale of genre scenes and portraits. They studied at the Düsseldorf Academy, which had a good reputation for the genre painters it produced. They studied drawing, proportion and anatomy. Hall was there for more than one year. He then went to France and studied in Paris for a year, visited Switzerland, and was in Italy for a year, where he had a studio in Rome.

Over the course of his life, Hall was based in the state of New York, but took international trips. For instance, in the 1870s he traveled to Palestine, Egypt and Spain. Hall had many friends from the Hudson River School.

== Career ==
Hall opened a studio in New York City in 1852. Hall's paintings, inspired by the British Pre-Raphaelite movement, often depicted still lifes, scenes from the Mediterranean countries or everyday life. The Smithsonian deems him to be "one of the most well-respected still-life painters in America," whose work was popular throughout his lifetime. Mid 19th century still life paintings became popular, and several artists created "opulent botanical arrangements in which the beauty and succulence of each flower or fruit replaced the earlier emphasis on compositional structure." Hall, Paul Lacroix, Severin Roesen and John F. Francis created such paintings.

His work was shown at the National Academy of Art first in 1853. His works included historic scenes, genre paintings and still lives. Hall's works were shown in a solo exhibition at Goupil and Company in New York City in 1856. At that time it was rare for an artist to have a solo show, "Mr. G.H. Hall was given a public exhibition of his works at Messrs. Goupil & Co.'s store, which mode of exhibiting an artist's productions is entitled to some considerations. We think it has many advantages. The artist can choose his own place and light, and his works can be seen much more satisfactorily, than when placed in the midst of others." Hall — along with Calvert Vaux, Frederic Edwin Church, Jervis McEntee, Eastman Johnson and Sanford Robinson Gifford — were friends and members of the Century Association in New York City, where they sang, laughed, drank and smoked. They hoped that proficient artists would be valued as keenly as successful men of business. Vaux had owned one of Hall's paintings.

Eleven people were killed on July 4, 1857, in the Dead Rabbits Riot, a battle between the Bowery Boys and a gang called the Dead Rabbits in Manhattan's worst slums located on the Lower East Side of the city. Hall made a picture, A Dead Rabbit (Study of the Nude, or Study of an Irishman), depicting a bare-chested man leaning up against a stone wall and clenching a brick in his right hand. (Note: It was exhibited at the National Academy of Design in 1942, 1979 and 1989.)

His still lifes were shown in 1860 at the academy and early in that decade at Seville, Spain. By 1868 he was making genre paintings and did not return to still lifes in great number until the 1880s.

He lived in Paris, Rome and Düsseldorf for 23 years and traveled to Spain and Italy, and made popular paintings of peasants there. He made one for his friend William Cullen Bryant of a gypsy girl that was one of the most recognized paintings.

By 1874 he had a studio in New York in the Tenth Street Studio Building, working from that studio for many years.

The Catskill Mountains in New York was a favored place to live and work for many 19th century artists, particularly landscape artists. In Kaaterskill Clove in Palenville, Hall built a home and studio near La Belle Falls by 1893 when his photo was taken there by Lionel De Lisser. Artists Grotto there is believed to have been named for Hall.

He had an art studio in Rome during many winters. It was there that Hall met artist Jennie Augusta Brownscombe; They became companions and he was her mentor. Between 1885 and 1896 they spent the winters in Rome. In the summers they shared a studio in Palenville in the New York Catskill Mountains from about 1908 until Hall died in 1913.

The Royal Shakespeare Company has a life-size painting that he made of William Shakespeare.

His work was shown at the American Art Union, Brooklyn Art Association and Boston Athenaeum. He was a member of the Union League Club and the National Academy of Design, although he resigned from the academy in 1855 in opposition to the practice of bringing on new members but not giving them a voice in the running of the institution. Eight years later he was brought back into the academy. At his death was one of its oldest members. He sold more than 1,569 of his paintings throughout his career.

== Death ==
Hall died in 1913 in New York, New York.

When he died, Hall left his home and property in the Catskills to Brownscombe, including the painting Danaë and the Golden Shower by John Smibert. Its location was unknown as of 1969. By 1912 she had donated a self-portrait made by George Henry Hall and a watercolor painting made by Hall of a Pompeiian fresco, to the Brooklyn Museum of Art. She also donated a George Henry Hall sketchbook to the museum.

== Collections ==
His works are in the following collections:

- Brooklyn Museum of Art
- St. Johnsbury Athenaeum, St. Johnsbury, Vermont
- Metropolitan Museum of Art, New York, New York
- Royal Shakespeare Company
- Smithsonian American Art Museum

== Gallery ==
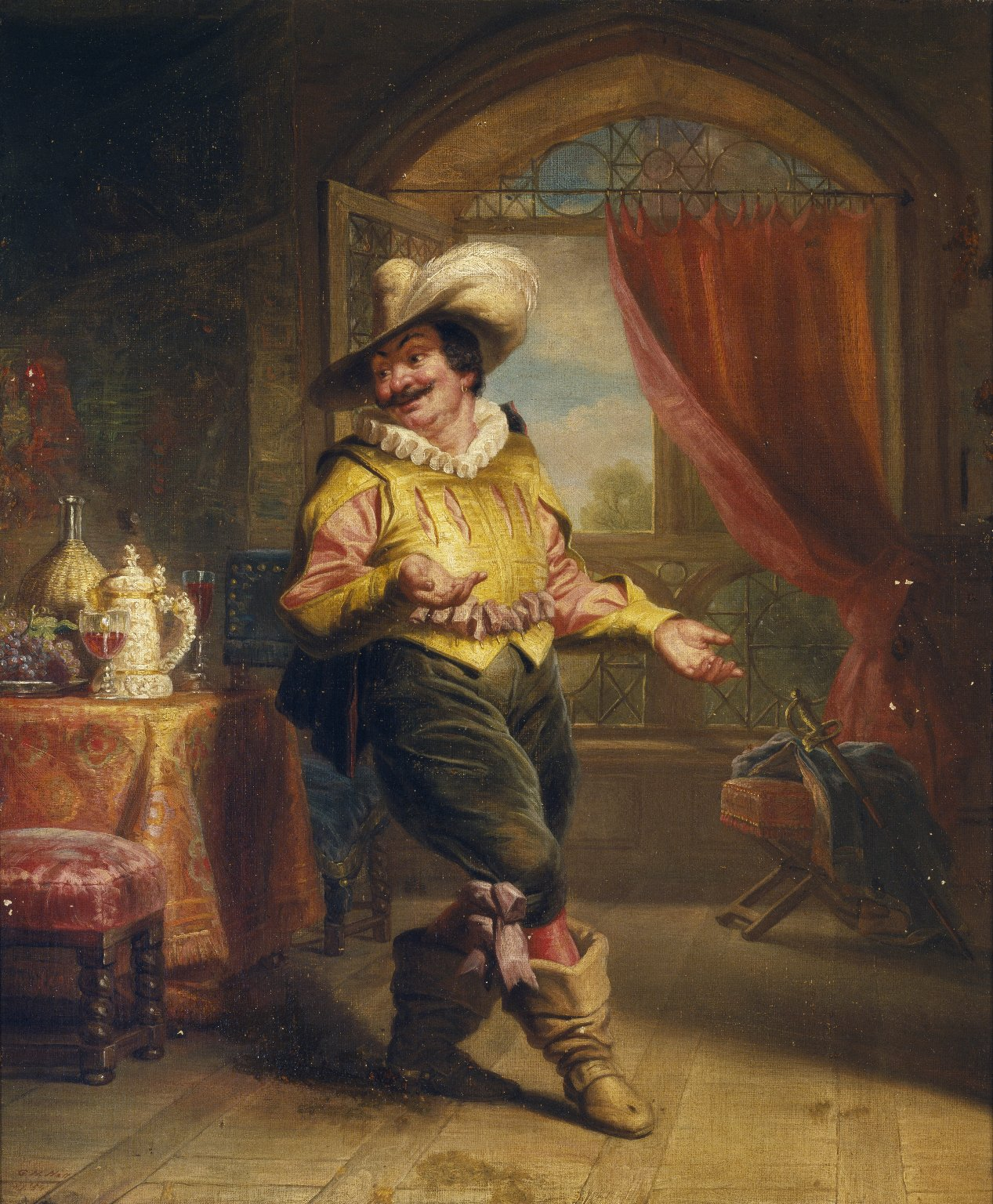
Sir Toby Belch, 1854, Folger Shakespeare Library

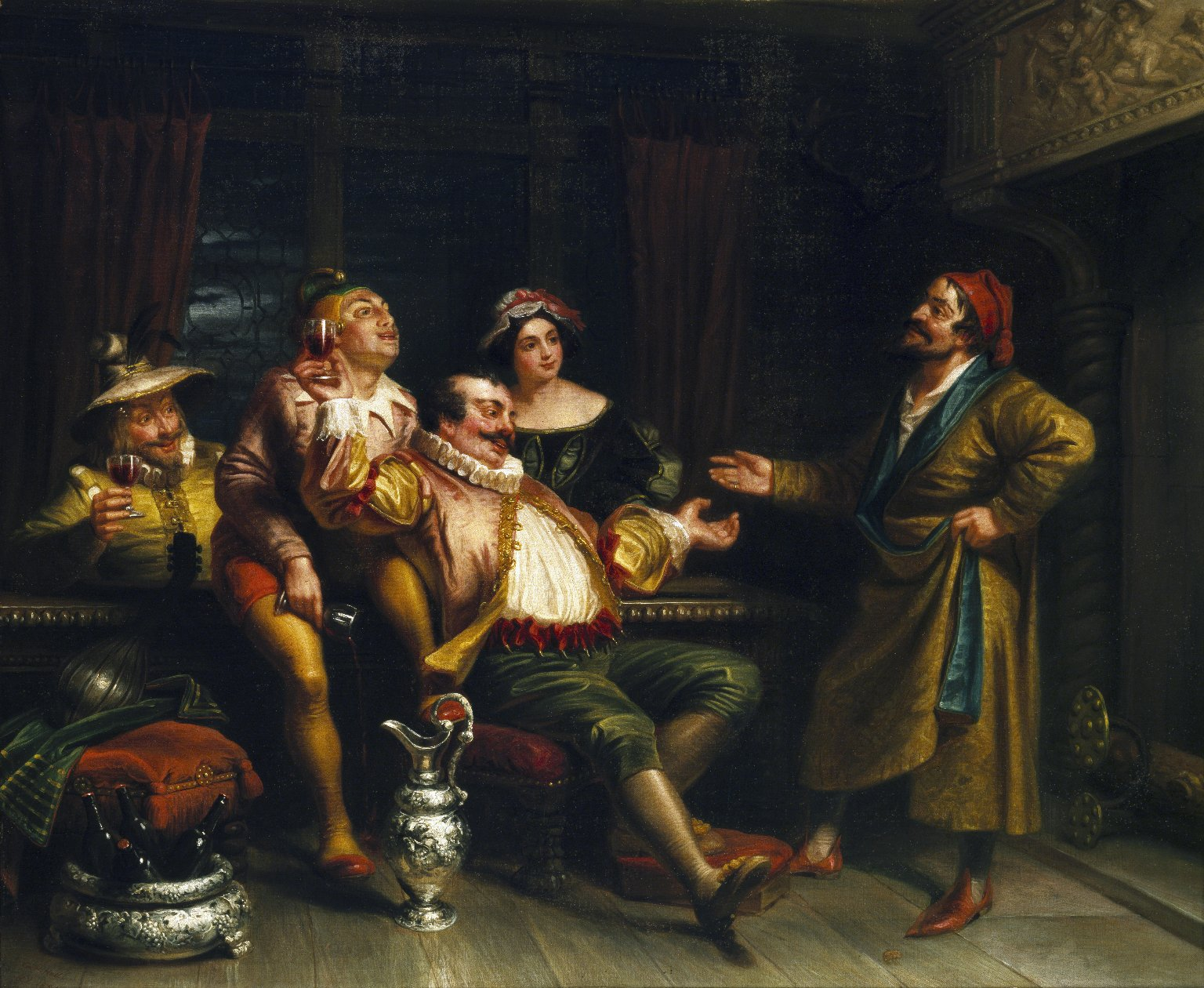
Malvolio confronting the revelers, 1855, Folger Shakespeare Library

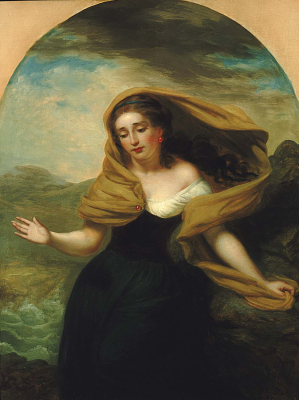
Miranda, 1856, Smithsonian American Art Museum

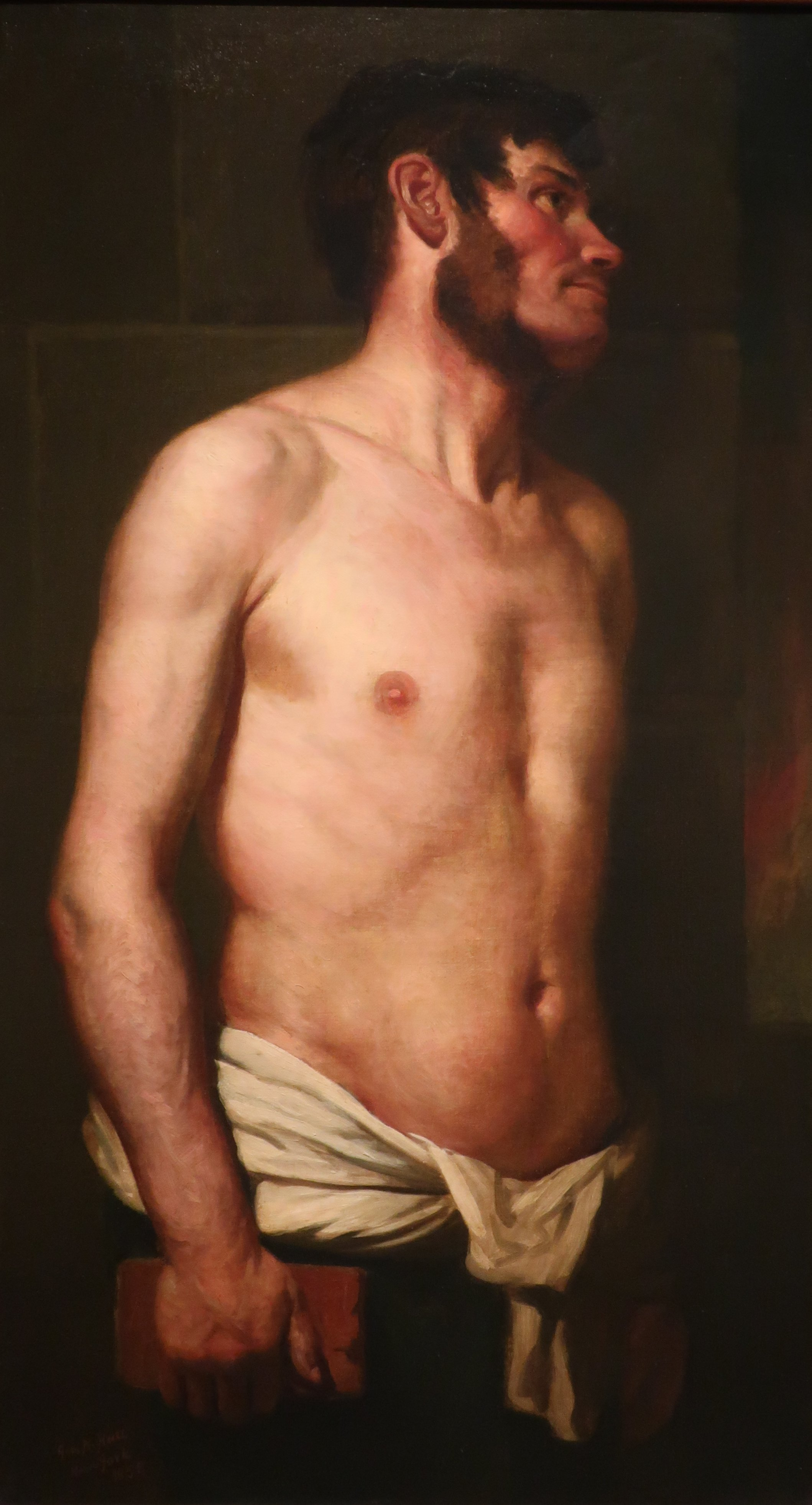
A Dead Rabbit, 1858. Also entitled Study of the Nude, or Study of an Irishman, it depicts a man meant to represent one of the Dead Rabbits gang members from the Dead Rabbits Riot of July 4, 1857, in New York City's Lower East Side slums

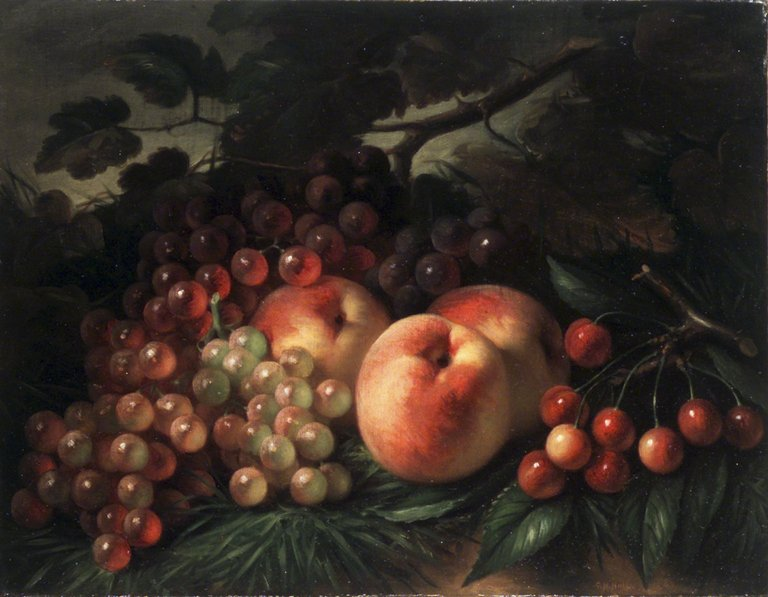
Peaches, Grapes and Cherries, c. 1860–1870, Brooklyn Museum of Art

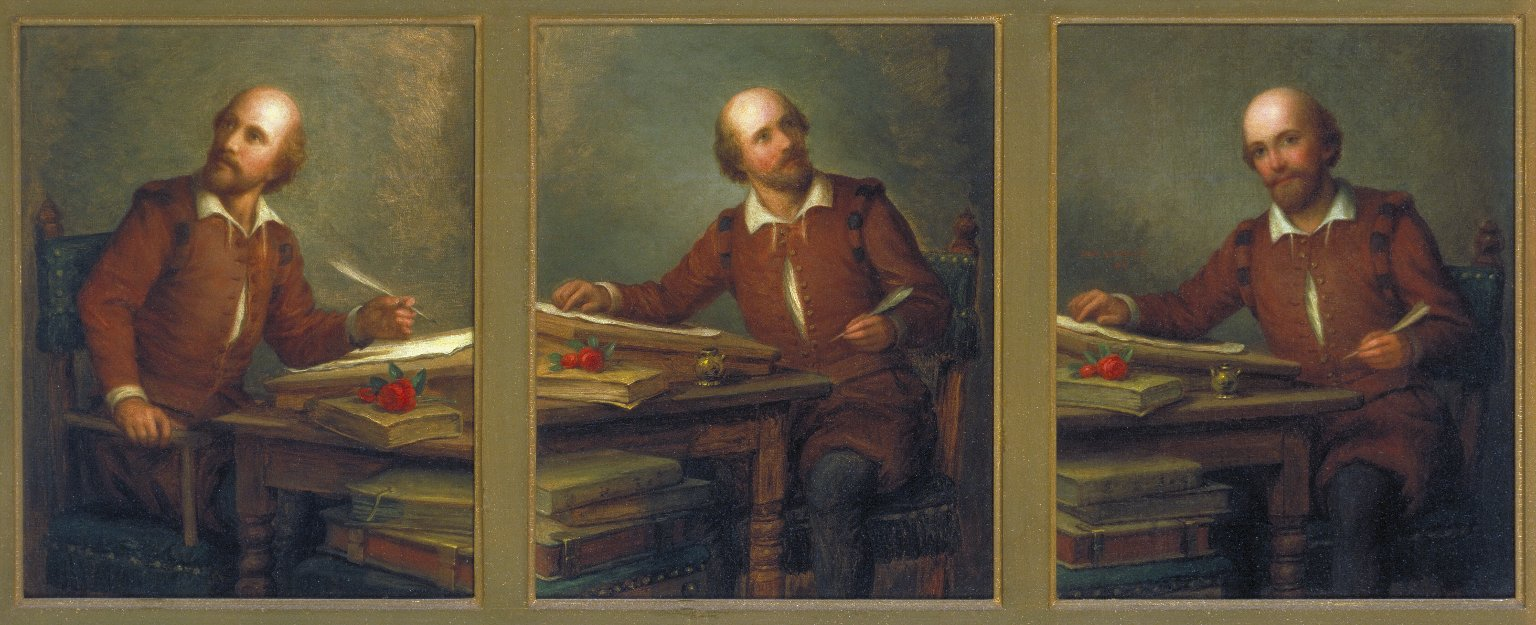
Shakespeare composing while looking outward, 1894

== See also ==
- List of Orientalist artists
- Orientalism
