= Richard Bernhard Smith =

American lyricist (1901–1935)

- Born: September 29, 1901; Honesdale, Pennsylvania, U.S.
- Died: September 28, 1935 (aged 33); New York City, U.S.
- Era: 20th century

Richard Bernhard Smith (September 29, 1901 – September 28, 1935) was an American lyricist who wrote the words for the popular Christmas song "Winter Wonderland", which was composed by Felix Bernard.

Smith was born on September 29, 1901, in Honesdale, Pennsylvania, the son of Eliza (Brunig) and John H. Smith, a partner with a glass manufacturing plant. His family was Episcopalian. He graduated Honesdale School in 1920 and attended Pennsylvania State College. Smith married Jean Connor, of Scranton, on March 30, 1930. He was diagnosed with tuberculosis in 1931. He succumbed to the disease on September 28, 1935, at Lenox Hill Hospital in New York City. He was 33. He was buried in Glen Dyberry Cemetery in Honesdale.
