= Glen Dyberry Cemetery =

Cemetery in Pennsylvania

- Interactive map of Glen Dyberry Cemetery

Details
- Established: 1859
- Location: Honesdale, Pennsylvania
- Country: United States
- Coordinates: 41.582°N 75.257°W
- Find a Grave: Glen Dyberry Cemetery

Glen Dyberry Cemetery is located in Honesdale, Pennsylvania.

== Description ==
The cemetery, alongside the Dyberry Creek, was granted organization in 1854 and features meandering pathways, hillside plots, and many ornamented burial markers. The cemetery includes a mausoleum built in 1891 and other notable features, making it a local landmark frequented by grave site visitors, walkers, and bicyclists alike.

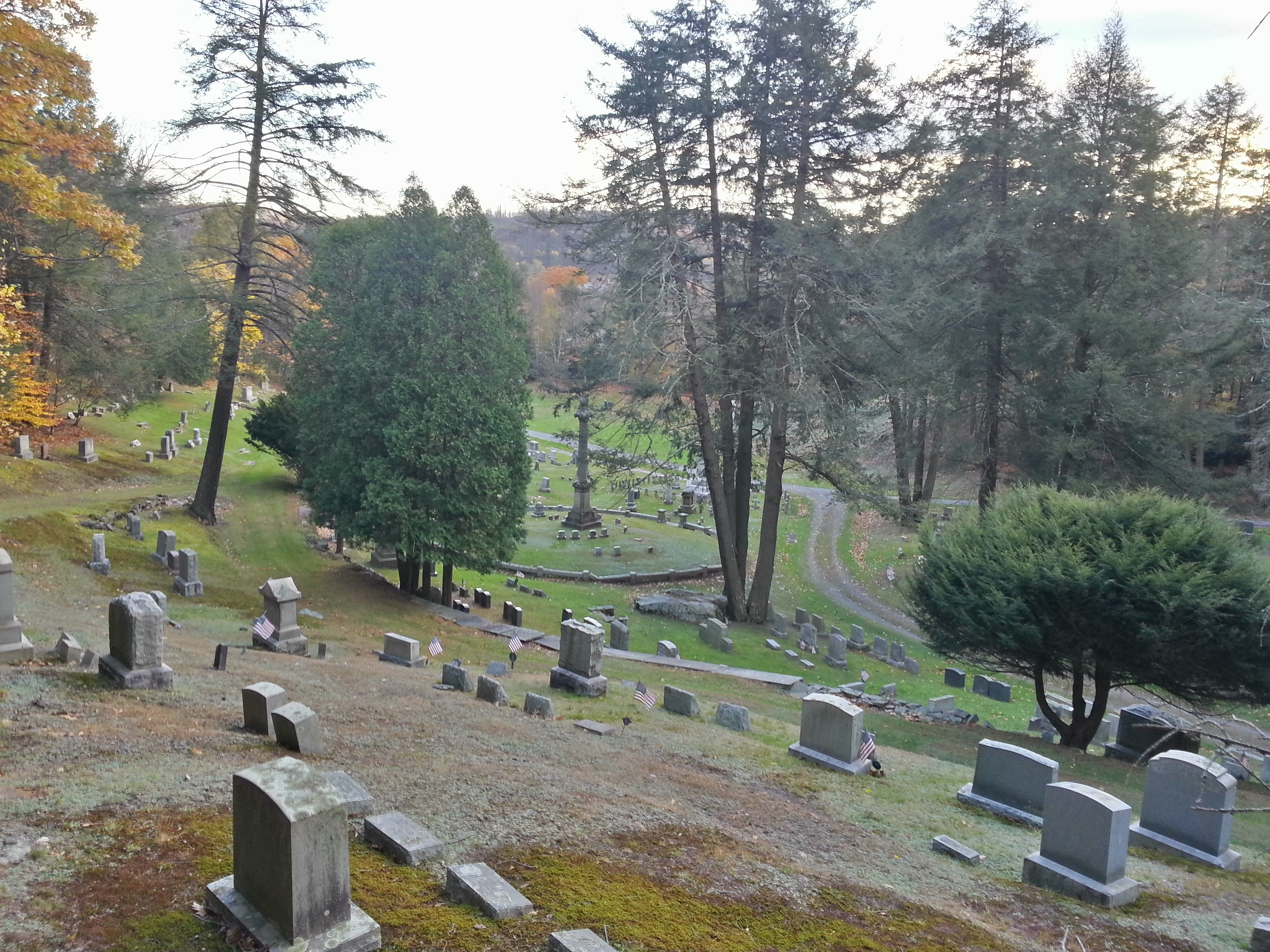
Glen Dyberry Cemetery South

== History ==
The Honesdale Cemetery Company was incorporated by prominent Delaware & Hudson Canal Co. officials from an act dated January 26, 1854. Mr. and Mrs. John Torrey sold 18 acres near Dyberry Creek for $2,000 in 1859 for the cemetery and 49 lots were sold during the first sale. Roads named Central Avenue, Hillside, Willow, and Winding Way were laid out within the cemetery. It opened on November 25, 1859.

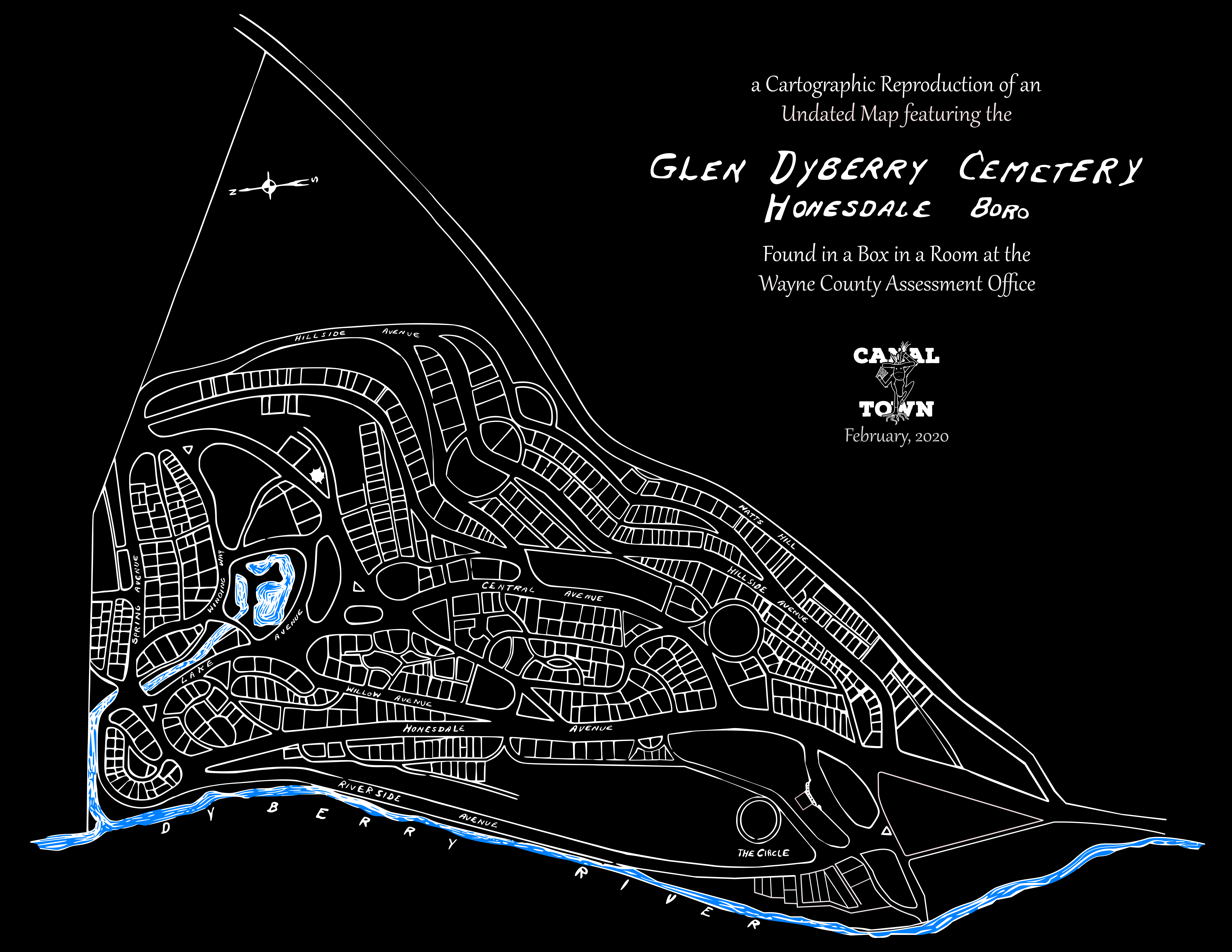
Glen Dyberry Cemetery Map Reproduction

Members of prominent families—Appley, Dimmick, Greene, Lord, Searle, Torrey, and Young—are buried at Glen Dyberry. About 4,000 people were buried in the cemetery as of 1947. Soldiers who fought in the War of 1812 and the American Civil War are buried there.

== Notable people ==
- Jennie Augusta Brownscombe, 19th-century artist and illustrator
- Susan E. Dickinson, Civil War era journalist
- William Harrison Dimmick, member of the U.S. House of Representatives from Pennsylvania
- Cornelius Comegys Jadwin, member of the U.S. House of Representatives from Pennsylvania
- David McKelvey Peterson, World War I flying ace
- Art Wall Jr., professional golfer
- Richard B. Smith, lyricist known for the song "Winter Wonderland"
