= Colonial Revival Movement =

Natural expression of early North American culture

The Colonial Revival movement was a national expression of early North American culture, primarily the built and artistic environments of the east coast colonies. The Colonial Revival is generally associated with the nineteenth-century provincial fashion for the Georgian and Neoclassical styles. The movement inspired a variety of expressions to fulfill symbolic and functional needs during times of great change. The Colonial Revival was motivated by a range of historical events, particularly a rapidly growing industrial way of life and increasing immigration. Beyond its association with the development of a national historic consciousness that began in the 1870s, the Colonial Revival style in architecture, decorative arts, landscape and garden design, and American art has served to promote notions of democracy, patriotism, good taste, and moral superiority.

Although its popularity continues to exist, particularly in architecture and decorative arts, the movement reached its peak between 1880 and 1940.

== See also ==
- Colonial Revival architecture
