= John F. Francis =

American painter (1808–1886)

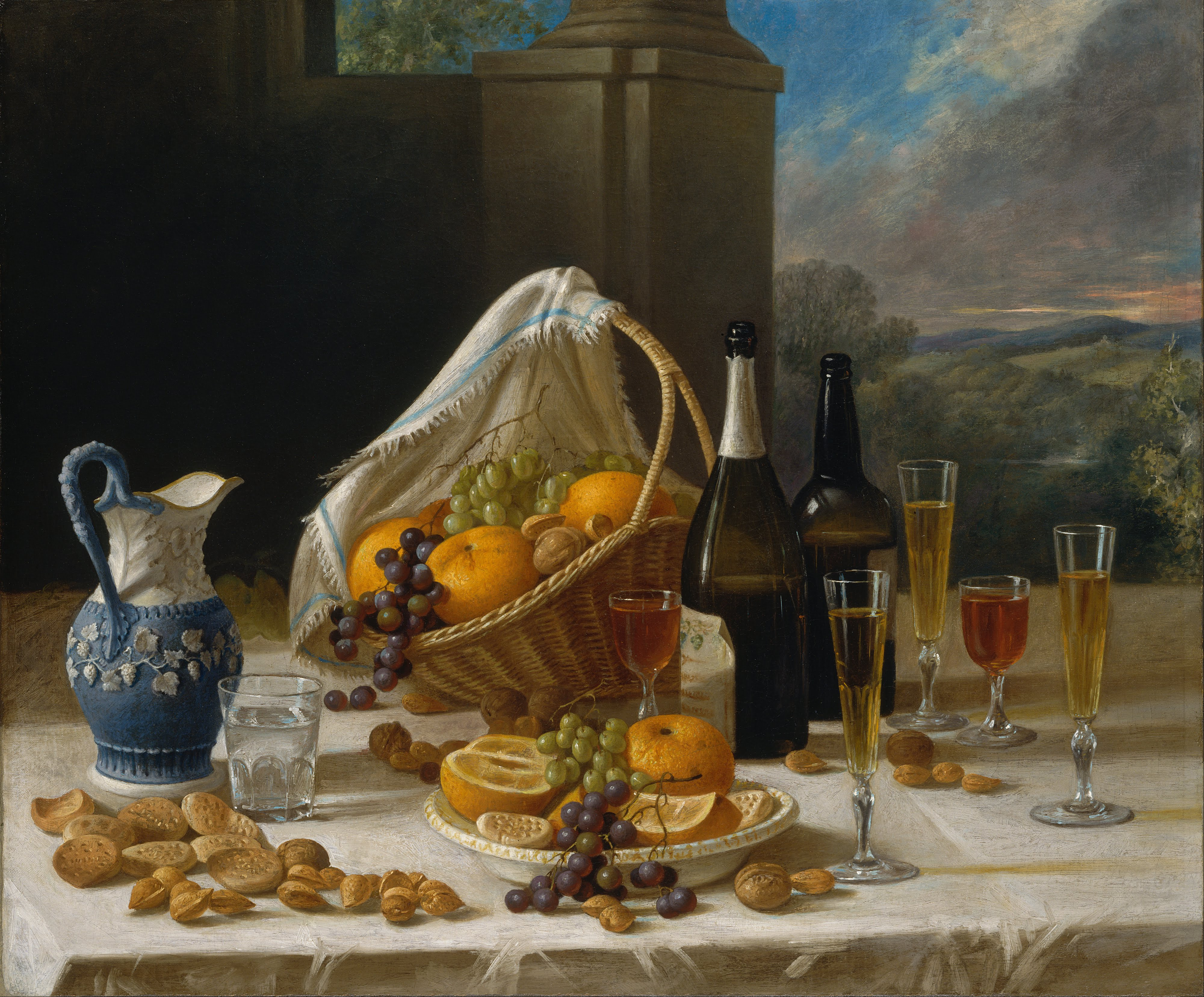
^{Smithsonian American Art Museum} Luncheon Still Life (c. 1860) by John F. Francis (private collection)

John F. Francis (August 13, 1808 – November 15, 1886) was an American painter, primarily of still lifes.

== Biography ==
Francis was born in Philadelphia, Pennsylvania. Predominantly self-taught as an artist, he worked until 1845 as a portrait painter in central and eastern Pennsylvania. Francis's portraits reveal his early fascination with minute detail. In 1845 Francis began exhibiting his works at the Pennsylvania Academy of the Fine Arts and the Philadelphia Art Union; both museums promoted American artists by awarding paintings to subscribers using lottery-like drawings. It was in this period that he began to concentrate on still lifes, which had been established as a popular genre in Philadelphia by Raphaelle Peale and other painters.

His first known still life is dated 1850, and by 1854 he had ceased to paint anything else. Francis became known as a leading painter of luncheon and dessert still lifes, developing an intricate vocabulary of forms required by his specialized subject. William H. Gerdts writes, "Of all the mid-century still-life specialists, Francis was the most painterly. There is often a freshness and a brio to his paint application that successfully balance his sure delineation of form and his establishment of texture."

Nearly all of his paintings depict fruits and desserts. He painted many replicas of his works, with his style displaying little change over the course of his career. According to art historian Alfred Frankenstein, "his blond, high-keyed palette always provides one of the most distinctive accents in a general exhibition of American still life". Few of his paintings can be dated after 1872, and none after 1880. He was for the most part forgotten by the time of his death in Jeffersonville, West Norriton, in 1886.

In 2013 a pair of his still lifes was appraised at $100,000.
