= Interpines sanitarium =

Interpines Sanitarium
- Goshen Sanitarium Company
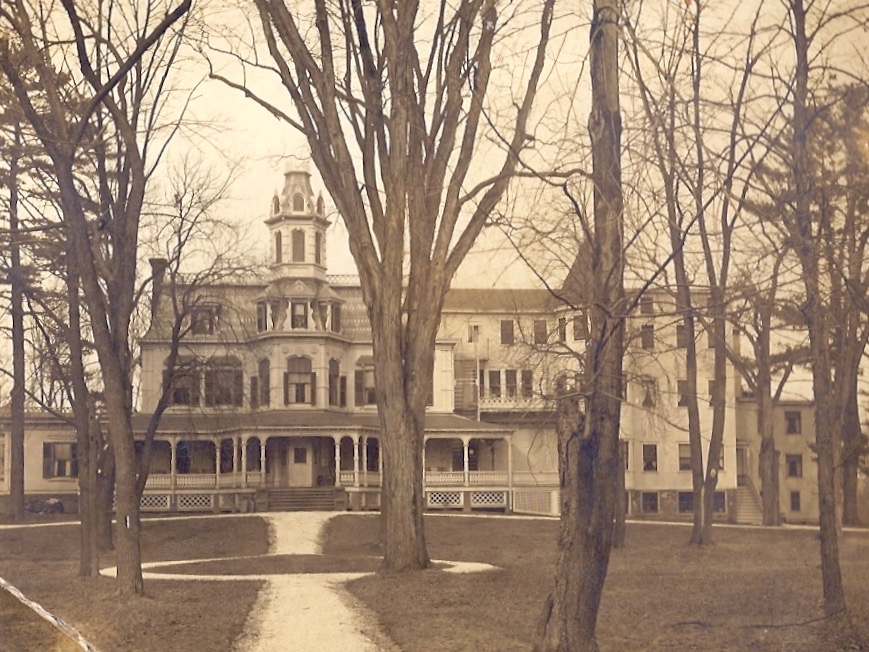
- Interpines Sanitarium, Goshen, NY. The main building, the Berdell mansion, with an addition on the north side.

Geography
- Location: Goshen, New York, United States

Organization
- Care system: Private
- Type: Specialist

Services
- Beds: 70
- Speciality: Disorders of the nervous system

Helipads
- Helipad: No

History
- Founded: 1890
- Closed: 1959
- Demolished: 1964

Links
- Lists: Hospitals in New York State

Interpines was a private hospital located in Goshen, New York, a village of three thousand inhabitants (in 1940). Interpines was founded in 1890 by F. W. Seward Sr. and subsequently directed by his son until closing in 1959. The core of the sanitarium was a Victorian mansion, which together with surrounding gardens provided a unique environment for the residing patients.

== History ==
Robert Berdell was a man of many successful business and financial enterprises who in 1864 became president of the Erie Railroad. For his home, he purchased the site of the General George Wickham house, which was built in 1774 on Main Street in Goshen. Berdell's house, very expensive and ornate in mid-Victorian style, was completed in 1867. Berdell's occupation of the house terminated in 1876 following an altercation with two brothers of the Murray family; one was shot and killed by Berdell. Berdell then sold his holdings in Goshen, and the house was vacant, except for a caretaker, for eight years.

The next owner was the Goshen Sanitarium Company in 1889. A year later, Seward added a north wing to the house and established the Interpines Sanitarium, first known as "Dr. Seward's Home for Invalids".

Although intended as a general health care home, it soon developed into a hospital specializing in "Disorders of the Nervous System". Following Seward's death in 1925, his son, Frederick W. Seward Jr., further enlarged the hospital by adding a second building in 1926. The sanitarium could accommodate up to seventy patients and gave employment to an equal number of people, many of whom were from local families. It was one of the larger businesses of Goshen. It provided care and treatment with homelike surroundings. People came to Interpines mostly from the metropolitan areas of New York City and northern New Jersey. The extensive grounds and gardens with the large parlors of the main building were used by local groups for meetings and functions.

The institution is gone now, out of business in 1959 due to changing times and deterioration. The buildings were razed and the site scraped clean in 1964 for development of the Orange County Government Center and a jail.

== Buildings and Grounds ==
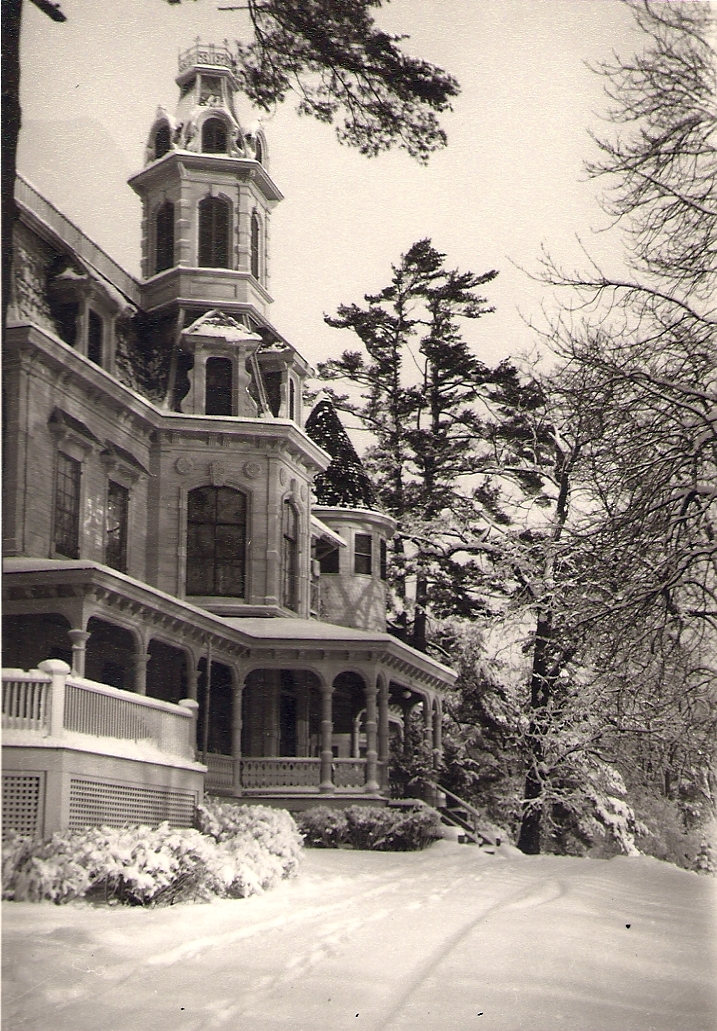
The Main Building in winter, c.1945. Photo by Alice Brody

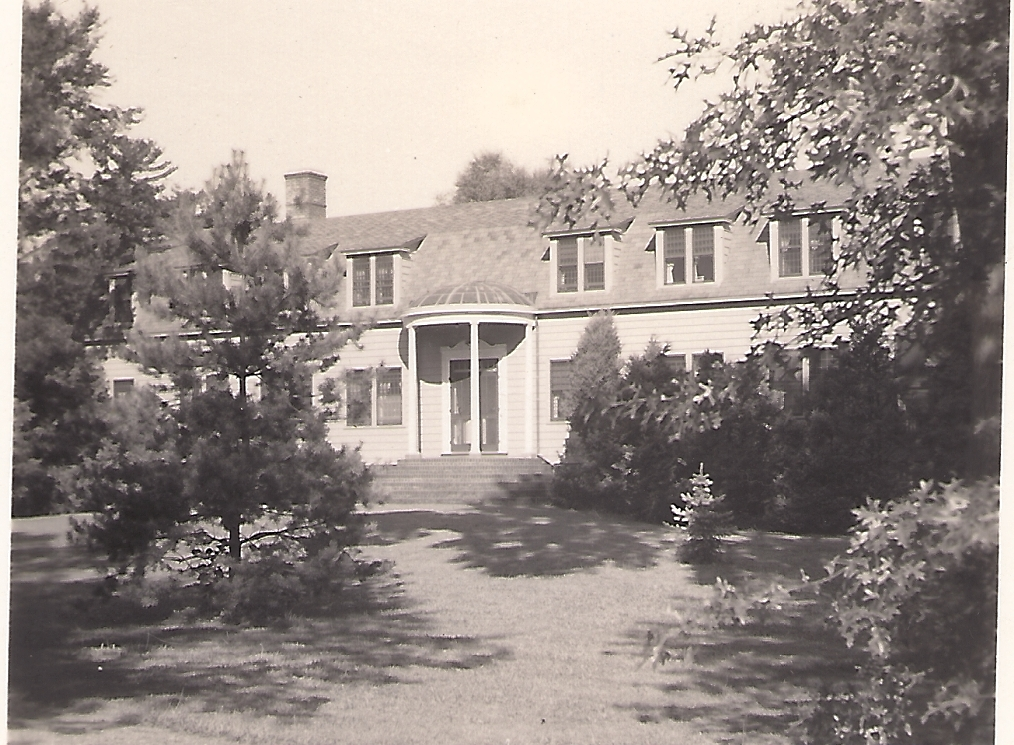
The Cory Building in summer, c.1938

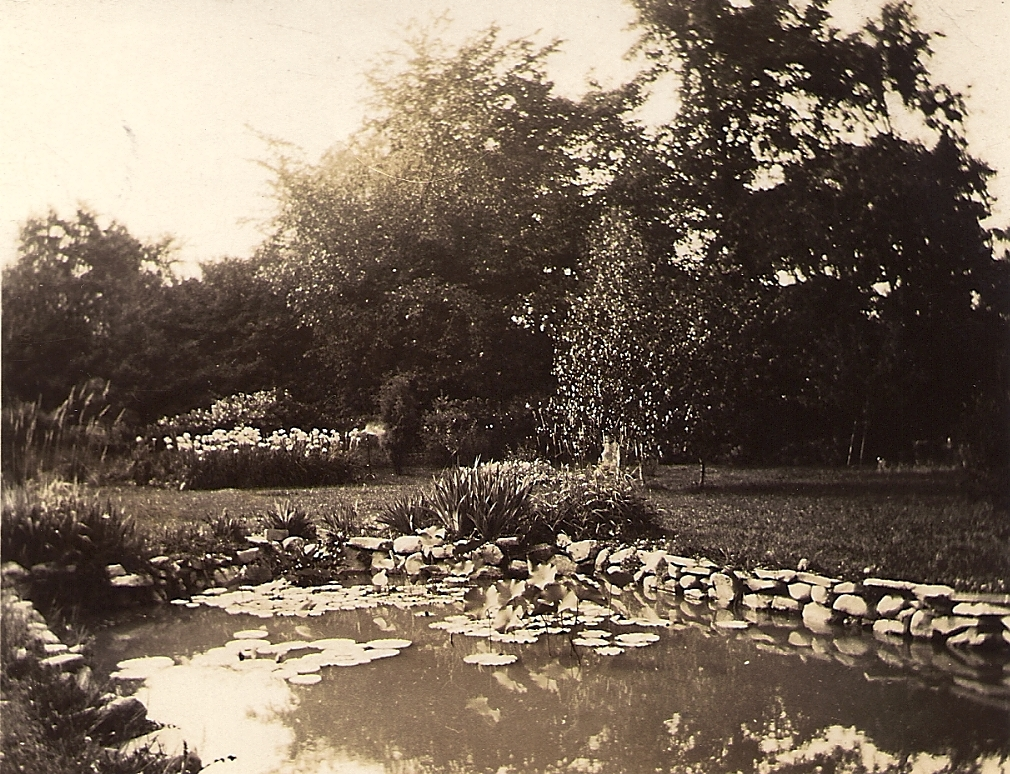
The garden lily pond with a bed of Iris behind, June 1930. Photo by Edna Kelly.

The institution comprised four buildings on a 19-acre (7.7 ha) square plot within the village of Goshen. The original mansion formed the core of the main building which housed female patients. A separate building for male patients, the Cory Building, was added in 1926. A third structure contained a six-car garage, a laundry, and a residence for nurses. A separate boiler house supplied steam heat and water to the other buildings. There were also small structures left from the original estate: a greenhouse, a pigeon coop, an aviary, and two summer pavilions. All were set in the landscaped center of the property with lawn, ponds, flower gardens, and gravel paths.

The original house with additions contained two wards for patients, an administrative office, and apartments for the families of the owner and two resident physicians. Female patients lived on the second and third floors, with the third floor a locked ward for those with serious problems. A large kitchen in the basement supplied food to a staff dining room on the first floor and to the three wards of the institution. The second floor was devoted to patients. There were bedrooms, a sitting room, a pantry, and a sun room with many indoor plants. The first floor retained the opulence of the original mansion. There were two parlors with chandeliers, a grand piano, a sun room, a library, a large staff dining room overlooking the rose garden, and a small pantry. There was a large office with desks for two doctors, a switchboard, a tiny pharmacy, and space for the bookkeeper.

Male inmates lived in the Cory Building, which was connected to the main house by a half-underground corridor. The building was two-story. The first floor had a large sitting room and pantry at one end, a corridor lined with patients' rooms, and a screened porch at the other end. The second floor was all patients' rooms.

Two thirds of the property was landscaped. The main house occupied a rise in the ground and was reached by a long drive stretching from one front corner to the other. This formed a semicircle which enclosed most of the front lawn, many large trees, a tennis court, and in the middle, a path going directly from the house front entrance to the Main Street sidewalk. The drive entrances were both flanked by stone planters, each with a light. Behind the main buildings there were lawns, flower gardens, and three ponds with water lilies. One was rather formal with rectangular shape and rock wall sides. A rock garden was nearby with small stream feeding a small circular pond. Further in back there was a third lily pond - long and narrow and in a natural setting, no side walls and water level flush with the grass. The ponds and rock garden were amid trees and flower beds and were traversed by gravel paths for walking. A pigeon coop stood next to the garage – a little octagonal house, home to a flock of about 30 white pigeons. The flock was often seen circling in the sky or perched on the roof of the garage. There was no fence around the property. Many patients had outside privileges and on a nice day would stroll in the gardens.
