= Warwick Village Historic District =

Historic district in New York, United States

- U.S. National Register of Historic Places
- U.S. Historic district
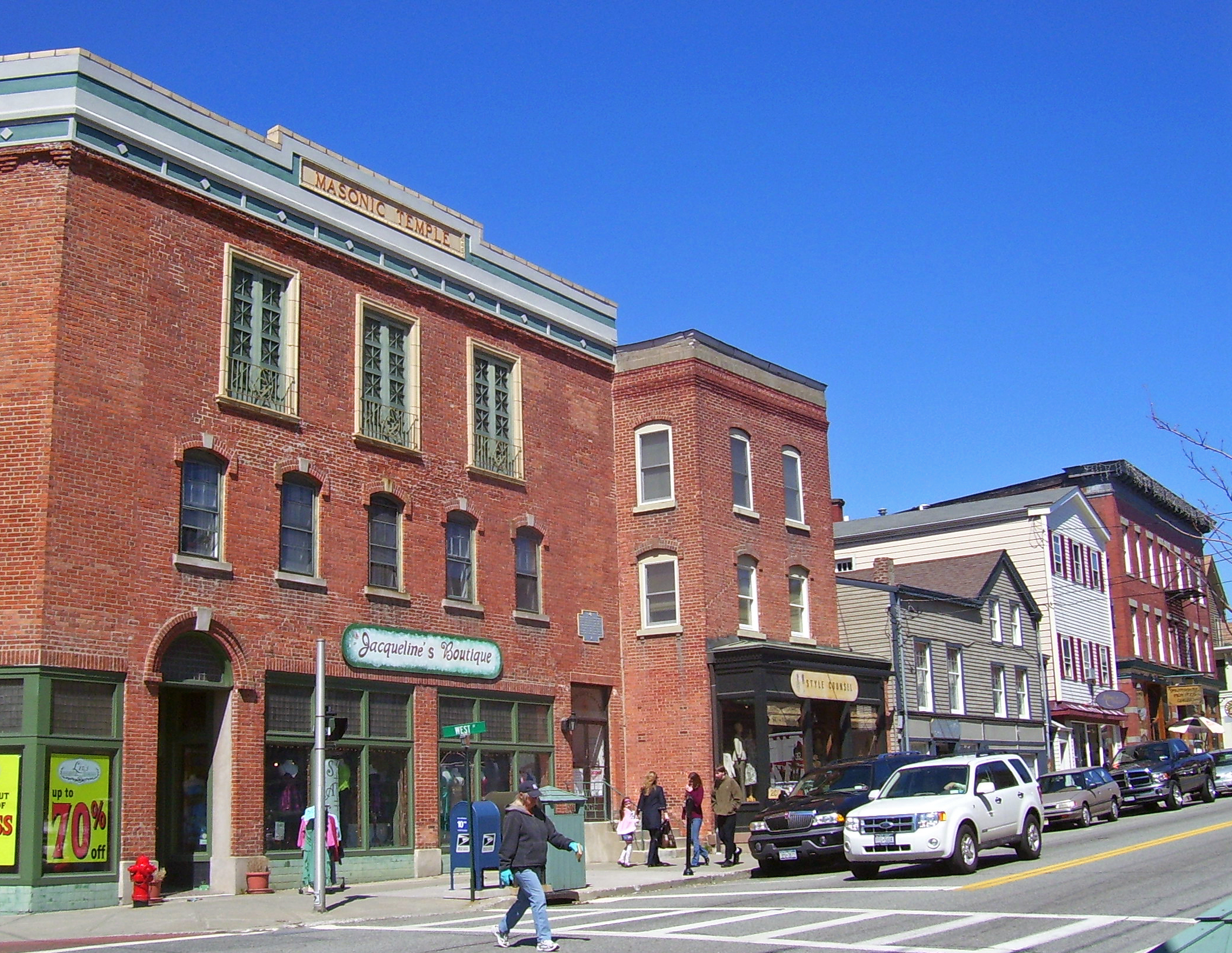
- Old Masonic temple and shops along Main Street, 2008

- Location within New York Location within the United States
- Location: Warwick, NY
- Nearest city: Middletown
- Coordinates: 41°15′23″N 74°21′35″W
- Area: 130 acres (42 ha)
- Built: 1750s-1930
- Architectural style: Federal, late Victorian and various 19th- and 20th-century revival styles
- NRHP reference No.: 84002886
- Added to NRHP: 1984

The Warwick Village Historic District is located in the center of the village of Warwick in the U.S. state of New York. It takes up an irregularly-shaped 130 acres (42 ha) of residential and commercial neighborhoods centered on NY 94 and 17A).

Buildings within the district reflect Warwick's growth over almost two centuries, from its origins as a rural settlement in colonial times through its mid-19th century industrialization as a rail hub to its development as a weekend summer resort town in the early 20th century. It was designated as a historic district and listed on the National Register of Historic Places in 1984.

== Geography ==
The district begins at the intersection of Oakland and Galloway avenues, where the two state highways begin their concurrency. Here the neighborhoods are almost all residential, except along Oakland where older houses have become restaurants and bed and breakfasts. On the west side it remains along Oakland until Campbell Road, where it starts to take in the houses on the west of the street. The Galloway Avenue boundary continues to Clinton Avenue, including all properties on the street to South Street but then excluding most of Belmar Court before returning to South.

At the railroad tracks the district Oakland becomes Main Street and the district boundaries include only it. Here the street lined with stores and multistory buildings, culminating in the village hall and Albert T. Wisner Library. At this busy four-way junction, Main becomes Maple Avenue.

The eastern boundary expands again at the Church Street junction to take in all properties (mainly on half that street, then follows Forester Avenue to Colonial Avenue (Orange County Route 13) in the residential neighborhoods there. All property on the north side to the village's northeastern boundary is included in the district.

West of the intersection, at Pine Island Turnpike (Orange County 1B), the district takes in the properties associated with St. Anthony's Hospital, Cherry Street and Van Duzer Place. It meets the northern boundary again at Robin Brae.

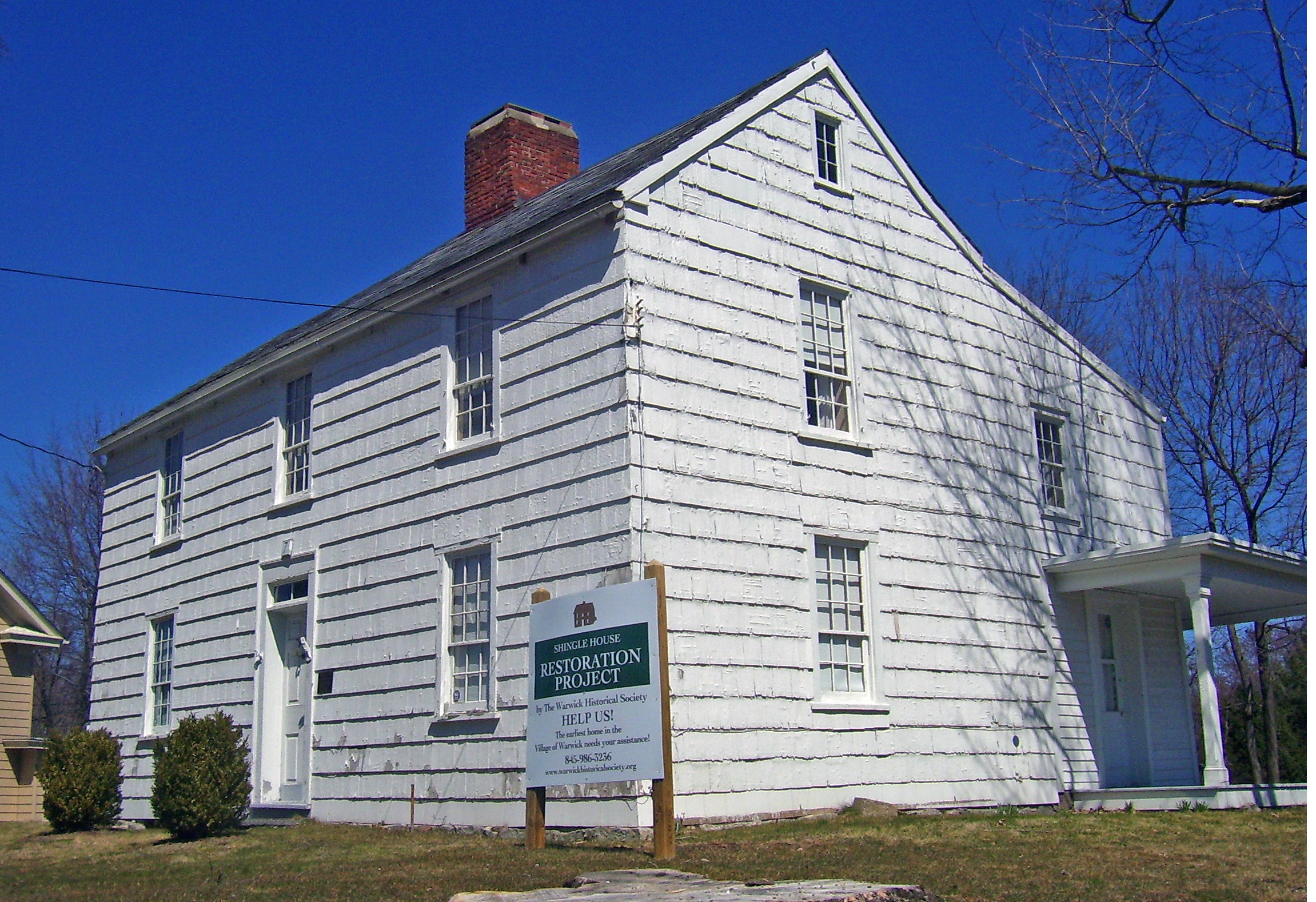
The Shingle House

== History ==
The Colonial-Main-Forester triangle is the oldest part of the district, built when the future village was mainly a stopover along the King's Highway that connected Phillipsburg, New Jersey to Newburgh. The Shingle House, built in 1764 and the oldest house in the village, is located at 7 Forester Avenue. Baird's Tavern, a stone structure with a gambrel roof built in 1766, is located nearby at 103-105 Main Street. Other buildings in this area, particularly the Old Baptist Meeting House, built in 1810 by a Connecticut congregation that had migrated west, date to the early 19th century.

The area along Main Street to the immediate south reflects the explosive growth of the village in the latter half of the 19th century, after the Civil War. Early industrial development in the Town of Warwick had passed the village by, since it lacked effective water power. But the coming of the Warwick Valley Railroad in 1862 changed that. It connected to the Erie Railroad's Main Line, which ran through the center of the county on its way to New York and other major cities, providing a market for the farmers around Warwick, particularly the nearby Black Dirt Region. Half of the district's buildings were built between 1860 and 1900.

The railroad continued to benefit the town in the early 20th century, when the descendants of the area's prosperous farming families built weekend cottages, large and small, for themselves to return to on weekends. Other city residents came to take advantage of the fresh air and country living, making the village an early resort destination mentioned in F. Scott Fitzgerald's The Great Gatsby. The houses and bungalows from this period can be found along the northern and southern ends of the district and its side streets, such as the Warwick Inn on Oakland.

Some of these residences were designed by village President Clinton Wheeler Wisner and his friend architect E. G. W. Dietrich of New York. Wisner's Warwickshire at 12 Linden Place is his most significant house within the village, and Dietrich's work dominates Oakland Avenue.

The onset of the Great Depression in 1930 curtailed further resort development, and by the end of that decade passenger rail service to the village ended (freight service via Norfolk Southern continues today, however). The rise of the automobile after World War II opened up newer areas to weekend travelers, and the village went into a decline, with little new architecture of note in its core. At the end of the century, it began to revive as an exurban home for commuters to New York City seeking a small town lifestyle.

== Significant contributing properties ==
All but 21 of the 229 properties within the district are considered contributing resources to its overall historic value. The remainder are mostly buildings erected after 1930, such as the village post office, a Burger King, and a brick gas station at the Main-Maple-Colonial junction.

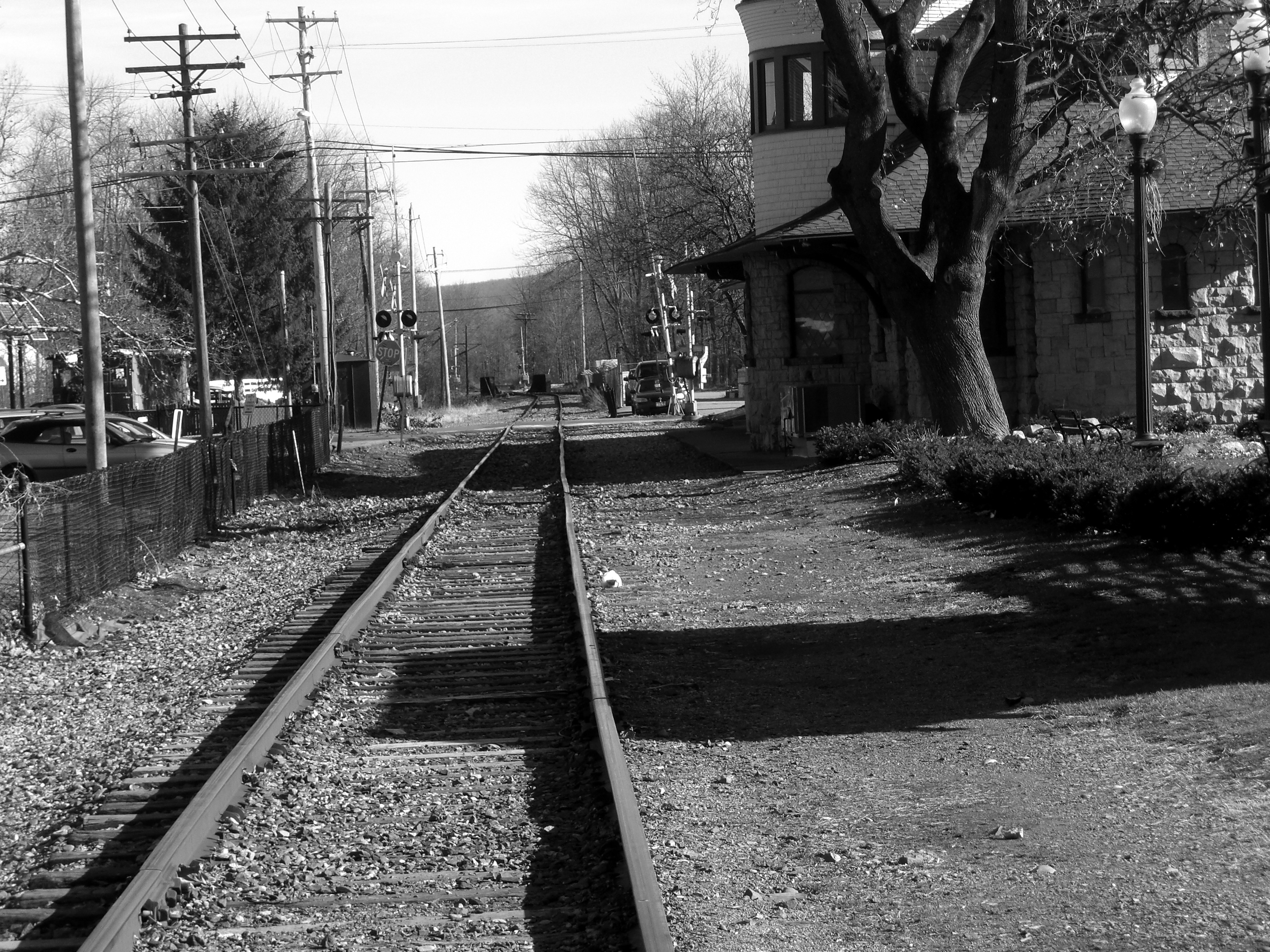
Warwick Station

None of the properties in the district are currently listed separately on the National Register. Some notable ones include:

- Shingle House: Saltbox house built by Daniel Burt in 1764; it is the oldest house in the village and a rare clapboard-and-shingle house in the region, recalling the New England origins of the Burt family. It is currently maintained and operated as a historic house museum by the Historical Society of the Town of Warwick, which has owned it since 1916. Much of the interior is original.
- Baird's Tavern The stone tavern at the center of town was built in 1766. Reportedly George Washington once stopped in for a "drink of grog"; John Trumbull also passed through. The wooden floor retains boot marks from the militia mustered here during the Revolution. It is currently preserved in history by the Warwick Historical Society in the upper levels, including a bedroom where Martha Washington, the Nation's first First Lady once stayed as a guest. The first floor of the structure was renovated in 2017, and is currently a working tavern serving food and drinks to travelers as it did during Revolutionary War times.
- Old School Baptist Meeting House: The 18 congregants who came from Connecticut in 1765 intended to stay only temporarily before moving on to Northeastern Pennsylvania, but the Revolution soon made that impossible. So this church built in 1810 became their home. The Historical Society acquired it for the sum of $1.00 in the 1950s to save it from demolition; it was also used as a location for a scene in the 1997 film In & Out.
- 1810 House. Another of the Warwick Historical Society's properties, this white cottage across Main Street from Village Hall was at one point the local YMCA. It once served as the main museum for the Society, however now houses an interior design and antique business. The Society's headquarters is now located at the A.W. Buckbee Center, 2 Colonial Ave., with exhibits devoted to not only the Village but famous residents such as Henry William Herbert, whose "Frank Forester" pen name lent its name to Forester Avenue.
- The Anchorage and Dulce Domum: Designed by architect E. G. W. Dietrich for future village President Clinton Wheeler Wisner and his cousin Louise E. Wisner respectively in 1884, these side by side houses on the west side of Oakland Avenue were described by the Warwick Dispatch shortly after their construction on August 13, 1885 as follows: "Situated on the western side of South Main Street... stand two houses which attract the attention of all who pass along the street. So entirely unlike are they from what the eye is accustomed to see, and so pleasing to the lover of picturesque effect in color and outline, that one never tires in studying them, always finding some new point of interest." Dolce Domum remains a private residence.
- John J. Beattie House: Built for the Orange County Judge in 1890, this Queen Anne home combines a shingled look with some unusual Romanesque features. It was designed by the respected NYC architectural firm, Lamb & Rich, several years after they designed Teddy Roosevelt's home, Sagamore Hill, in Long Island.
- The Warwickshire: Wisner's most significant work in Warwick dates to the 1890s and is located at the corner of Oakland and Linden. It uses randomly coursed fieldstone and half-timber framing.

== Preservation ==
The buildings of the district were very well preserved at the time the district was established. The village has recognized it in its zoning code with architectural restrictions that, for example, forbid intrusive features such as signs lit from the inside on stores within the district. This caused some local controversy in 1990 when the local Independent Order of Odd Fellows chapter wanted to renovate its lodge with vinyl siding, forbidden by the zoning. A bitter confrontation led to a compromise solution where the IOOF was allowed to use vinyl on the rear and sides of the building as long as they painted the front.

The historic district also became the center of another protracted local political dispute in 2000. After the Grand Union supermarket chain closed its downtown Warwick location, within the district, following its third and final bankruptcy, the CVS drugstore chain expressed interest in moving into the abandoned space. Some local residents were willing to let that happen since without it there would be no major retailer in the downtown area, while others feared it would detract from the district's historic character and lead locally owned shops along Main to close. After two years of debate that included a protest rally at the site, and a proposal to condemn the site, CVS opened its store in 2003.
