= Transit Orange =

Bus transit services in Orange County, New York

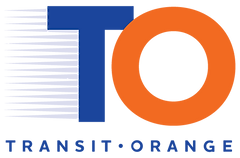

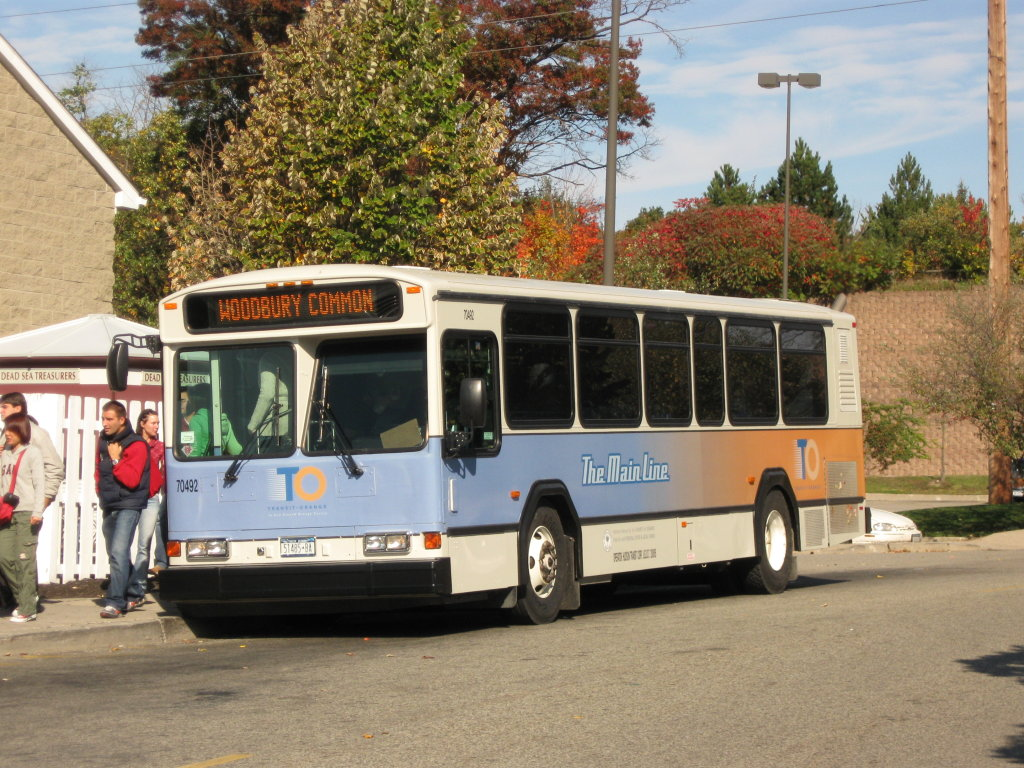
- A Transit Orange bus on The Main Line in 2008
- Parent: Orange County Department of Planning
- Founded: 2006
- Headquarters: 1887 County Building; 124 Main St; Goshen, NY 10924
- Service area: Orange County, NY
- Service type: Local buses, Dial-a-bus
- Routes: 14
- Hubs: Middletown Terminal; Woodbury Commons; Downtown Newburgh; Wallkill Malls
- Annual ridership: 948,891 (county total, 2023) (Note: Includes local services (836,089), dial-a-bus (101,247), and The Main Line (11,555). Excludes the Beacon-Newburgh-Stewart shuttle.)
- Fuel type: Diesel
- Website: Official website

Transit Orange is the brand name for bus transit services in Orange County, New York. Under the brand name of Transit Orange, mini-systems, mostly municipally-run, serve various towns across Orange County. In addition to these municipal and private services, Transit Orange also owns The Main Line bus, and oversees municipal dial-a-bus operations. Along with Short Line Bus and the Metro-North Port Jervis Line, Transit Orange forms the basis of public transportation in Orange County.

== History ==
Bus service in Orange County began in 1934, when Newburgh's system was founded. In 1935, Middletown's system commenced operations. Kiryas Joel's system likely was created sometime in the 1970s, when Kiryas Joel was founded. By the mid-2000s, 16 different private companies operated in Orange County, and none had any connections with each other.

As a solution, Transit Orange was created in 2006 to consolidate and unify the operations of the multiple different companies that ran services in Orange County at the time. Transit Orange did not directly take over or replace any transit systems, however local and dial-a-bus services began using county-owned and Transit Orange-branded vehicles. In 2023, services overseen by the county had a total ridership of 948,891 passengers per year. (Note: Includes local services (836,089), dial-a-bus (101,247), and The Main Line (11,555). Excludes the Beacon-Newburgh-Stewart shuttle.)

In June 2024, system redesign proposals were released for the Middletown and Newburgh systems.

== Services ==
Transit Orange does not directly operate any routes; all operations are contracted out. When the operator is known, it is listed.

=== Municipal local services ===
All municipal services are operated as their own private companies, but their fleets mostly or entirely consist of leased buses owned by Transit Orange, and all services operate under the Transit Orange brand name.

==== Middletown ====
The Middletown system, officially known as the Middletown Transit Corporation, is operated by Short Line Bus. Four routes operate from a central hub on Railroad Avenue, located in Downtown Middletown. The system has existed since 1935.

In June 2024, a system redesign proposal was released for the Middletown system.

All routes operate as loops, serving different parts of Middletown and the surrounding towns:

- Route 1 serves Highland Avenue, the Tall Oaks Apartments, and Fei Tian College.
- Route 2 serves the David Moore Heights housing development, the Middletown ShopRite, the Middlecrest Crossing Apartments, and Orange County Community College's Middletown campus.
- Route 3 serves the Orange Plaza Mall, the Galleria Mall, Crystal Run, and the Orange Regional Medical Center. This route also connects with the Middletown–Town of Wallkill Metro-North station.
- Route 4 serves Wallkill Senior Housing, the Wallkill Shoprite, the Wallkill Plaza Mall, and the Wallkill Town Center Mall.

==== Newburgh ====
The Newburgh system, officially known as the Newburgh-Beacon Bus Corporation, but commonly known as Newburgh Area Transit, operates four routes that converge on downtown Newburgh. The system has existed since 1934. The company is owned by Leprechaun Lines, which in addition to the local services, operates two other services: the Beacon-Newburgh-Stewart Shuttle from Beacon, New York to Stewart International Airport via Newburgh, and a commuter bus from Poughkeepsie to White Plains. These bus routes are not affiliated with Transit Orange, and use Leprechaun Lines-branded buses. However, connections can be made to the Beacon-Newburgh-Stewart Shuttle from local Newburgh routes.

In June 2024, a system redesign proposal was released for the Newburgh system.

The Newburgh system operates four routes:

Route Name	Termini		via	Notes
Broadway	Newburgh; Liberty St & Broadway	Gardnertown; Newburgh Towne Mall	Broadway, NY-300	
Northside	Newburgh; Liberty St & Broadway	Balmville; N Plank Rd & Chestnut Ln	Liberty St/West St, N Plank Rd	
Southside	Newburgh; Liberty St & Broadway	New Windsor; Cedar Av & Union Av	NY-32, Cedar Av, NY-94, Water St	
Crosstown	Newburgh; St Lukes Hospital	Cornwall; Cornwall Hospital	Quaker St, NY-32, NY-94	Operates via Liberty & Broadway

==== Kiryas Joel ====
The Kiryas Joel system, officially and commonly known as Kiryas Joel Area Transit, serves the heavily-Hasidic Jewish village of Kiryas Joel. The service is operated by the village itself, using mostly buses owned by Transit Orange, although the village does own some of its own buses. This system gets the most ridership of any of the systems by far – 627,381 riders in 2023 – and comprises a majority of the total ridership of Transit Orange. Kiryas Joel is also served by Monsey Trails and Monroe Bus Lines, which while also catering to the Hasidic community, are not affiliated with Kiryas Joel Area Transit or Transit Orange. In keeping with Shabbat, services do not run on Friday afternoons or Saturdays.

The Kiryas Joel system operates three routes:

Route Name	Termini		via	Notes
Local	Kiryas Joel; Shopping Center	Kiryas Joel; Toltchav Wy & Dinev Pl	Village Loop	Operates in different directions each hour
Woodbury Commons	Kiryas Joel; Shopping Center	Central Valley; Woodbury Commons	Village Loop, Spring St, Nininger Rd	
Walmart	Kiryas Joel; Shopping Center Toltchav Wy & Dinev Pl	Harriman; Harriman Commons Mall	Village Loop, Spring St, Larkin Wy	Operates in a loop from one Kiryas Joel terminus to Harriman Commons then back to the other Kiryas Joel terminus

==== Warwick ====
The Warwick system, which is municipally operated and part of the same agency as the Warwick Dial-a-Bus, operates a local bus route in the Village of Warwick and shuttle services to Monroe, Goshen, and Wallkill. The Warwick system uses solely minibuses, and vehicles are shuffled between dial-a-ride and fixed-route services.

In total, the town operates three fixed routes:

Route Name	Termini		via	Notes
Local Village Shuttle	Warwick Village; Homestead Village	Warwick; ShopRite/Price Chopper St Stephens Church	Village Loop	Only runs to St Stephens Church on Sundays
Wallkill/Goshen Shuttle	Warwick Village	Wallkill; Galleria Mall	NY-94, NY-17M, NY-17	Reservations required; Serves Goshen as well as Wallkill; Operates Wednesday through Saturday
Monroe Shuttle	Warwick Village	Monroe	Unknown	Reservations required; Unknown routing; Operates on the first and third Friday of each month.

==== Port Jervis ====
In addition to the Port Jervis dial-a-bus, which also extends into Deerpark, the city of Port Jervis operates a fixed bus loop on Mondays and Fridays from 10am to 2pm, serving various destinations across the city.

==== Monroe ====
In addition to the Monroe dial-a-bus, which also serves the town of Woodbury, the town of Monroe also operates two fixed routes. The first one is the Monroe Dial-a-Bus Express Loop, which serves various locations in the town, including the village of Monroe, Woodbury Commons, Larkin Drive, and the village of Harriman. Secondly, starting in Spring 2024, the town of Monroe announced a once-monthly route to Wallkill, which requires reservations, similar to Warwick's services. In 2023, the Express Loop served 5,497 passengers, or approximately 100 per day.

=== The Main Line ===
The Main Line service operates between Middletown and Woodbury Commons. On weekends, it is extended to the Harriman Metro-North station. It is operated by Short Line Bus. Unlike all other services, the buses on the Main Line are not owned by Transit Orange, but rather by Short Line Bus.

=== Dial-a-Bus ===
Dial-a-Bus services are operated by the following towns:

- Goshen and Chester (combined service)
- Highlands
- Kiryas Joel/Palm Tree
- Monroe
- Montgomery and Crawford (combined service)
- Newburgh
- Port Jervis and Deerpark (combined service)

== Fleet ==
A Gilig Low Floor in Transit Orange livery

The municipal local services mostly use a fleet of 29- and 35-foot Gillig Low Floor hybrid-electric buses, which were constructed in 2013. In addition to these buses, Kiryas Joel operates three Vicinity buses that are owned by the village itself (as opposed to Transit Orange, like the rest of the fleet). Also in addition to the 2013 Gilligs, Newburgh uses two 2022-built diesel-powered Gilligs, which are owned by Transit Orange. As opposed to the other systems, Warwick uses exclusively minibuses on their local routes, and has a shared fleet with their dial-a-bus system.

The Main Line bus uses Short Line-owned buses, usually Gillig Low Floors or Phantoms. These are separate from the Transit Orange-owned Gilligs.
