= Warwick Valley High School =

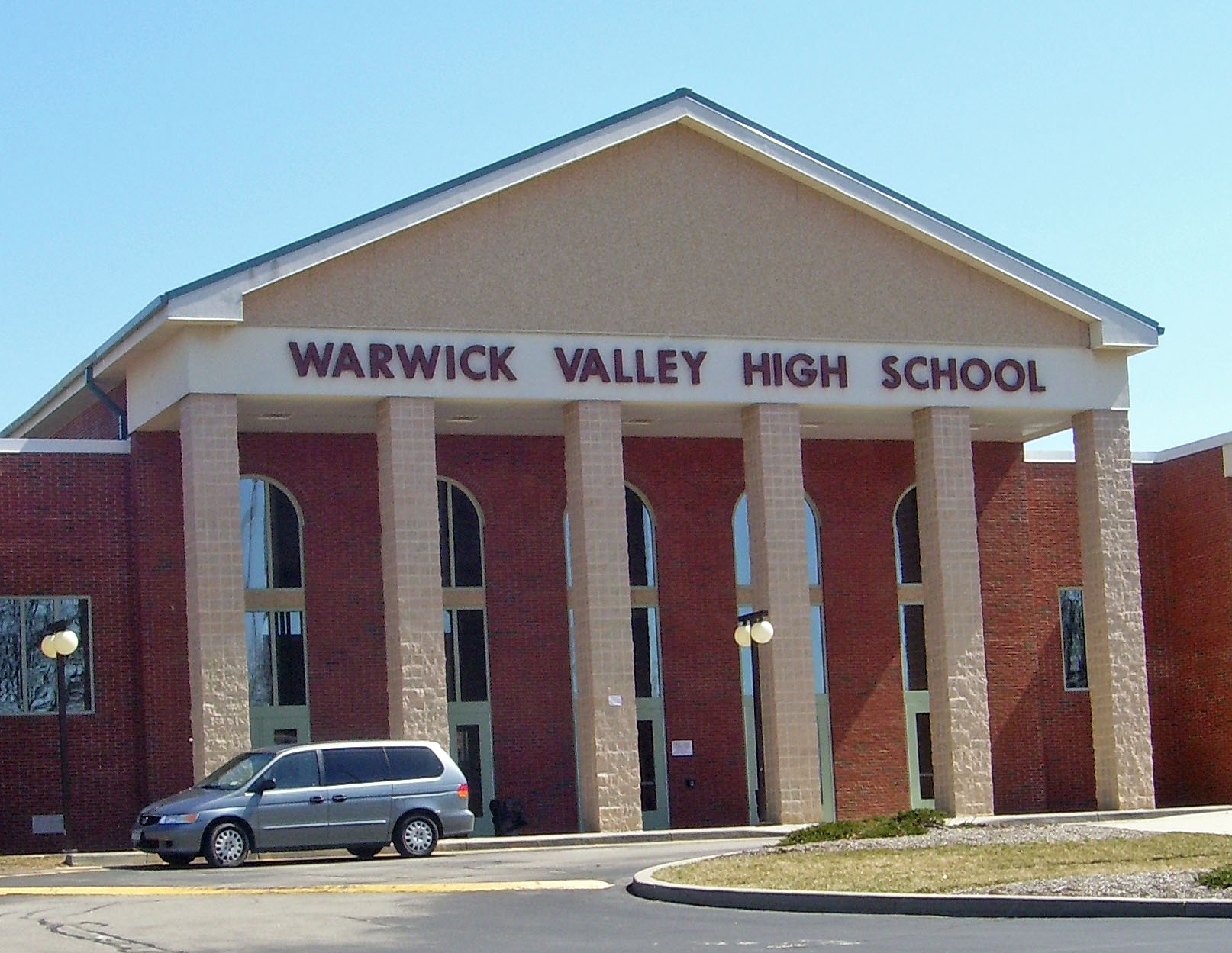
- Front entrance of school building

Location
- 89 Sanfordville Road; Hudson Valley; Warwick, NY 10990; United States; 41°15′10″N 74°23′19″W

Information
- School type: Public, High school
- School district: Warwick Valley Central School District
- Principal: Georgianna Diopoulos
- Staff: 120
- Teaching staff: 100.82 (FTE)
- Grades: 9-12
- Average class size: 22
- Student to teacher ratio: 13.34
- Language: English
- Hours in school day: 7.5
- Campus type: Rural
- Colors: Purple and Gold
- Athletics conference: Orange County Interscholastic Athletic Association
- Mascot: Wildcat
- Nickname: The Wick
- Team name: Wildcats
- Newspaper: The Survey
- Communities served: Town and village of Warwick
- Feeder schools: Warwick Valley Middle School Greenwood Lake Middle School
- Website: wvhs.warwickvalleyschools.com

Warwick Valley High School (WVHS) is located on Sanfordville Road outside the Village of Warwick, New York, United States. It educates students in grades 9 through 12 in the Warwick Valley Central School District, which covers most of the village and town of Warwick, including the hamlet of Pine Island. Students in those portions of the town near the village of Florida and the village of Greenwood Lake attend other high schools. A referendum to send students from the latter community to WVHS failed in 2007.
