= Sean Slaughter =

American Christian hip hop musician (born 1976)

- Born: Sean Martin Slaughter; May 4, 1976 (age 50); Queens, New York City, New York
- Origin: Warwick, New York; Newport News, Virginia
- Genre: Christian hip hop
- Occupations: Singer, songwriter
- Instrument: Vocals
- Years active: 1991–present
- Website: slaughtermusic.com

Sean Martin Slaughter (born May 4, 1976) is an American Christian hip hop musician. He started making hip hop music in 1991 but did not release a commercial album until 1999. He has released eight studio albums, ...And Justice for All (1999), The World Is Not Enough (2001), Slaughter Music Presents...the Dungeon Underground Classics, Chapter 1 (2002), Die Another Day (2005), Just Add Water (2006), Man on Fire (2008), The Prototype (2010) and Prototype 2 (2014).

== Early life and background ==
Sean Martin Slaughter was born on May 4, 1976, in Queens, New York City, New York, the son of Alvin Slaughter, and was raised in Queens and Brooklyn. Slaughter explains that his relationship with his father was strained growing up, as his father was often away, and, when he was available, Sean was not very interested in the church or his father's music activities. He graduated from Warwick Valley High School in Warwick, New York, in 1994, where he spent his time as a teenager, before going off to college. He received a full football scholarship to University of Rhode Island, where he majored in business marketing. However, he lost the scholarship after failing to maintain the grades required, and turned to producing hip-hop music instead. Slaughter claims that he produced five songs for Wu-Tang Clan affiliate members M.M.O during this period. He went on to study audio engineering, and received a diploma from the Institute of Audio Research, in 1997. Slaughter obtained his baccalaureate from Regent University in organizational leadership and management, in 2010. His master's degree in education was earned at Liberty University in 2016. Slaughter became a confessed Christian in 1999, before his hip hop music ministry started.

== Music career ==
His music recording career in 1991, with his first studio album, ...And Justice for All, being released in 1999. The subsequent album, The World Is Not Enough, was released in 2001. He released a third album, Slaughter Music Presents...the Dungeon Underground Classics, Chapter 1, in 2002. His fourth studio album, Die Another Day, was released in 2005. Slaughter's fifth release, Just Add Water with Mona J., came out in 2006. Man on Fire was released in 2008. His seventh album, The Prototype, was released in 2010. That album's sequel, Prototype 2, came out in 2014.

== Personal life ==
He is the executive director of Y.H. Thomas Community Center. His wife is Kimtrese, and together they have two children, both daughters, Lyric and Jazz.

== Discography ==
Studio albums

- ...And Justice for All (1999)
- The World Is Not Enough (2001)
- Slaughter Music Presents...the Dungeon Underground Classics, Chapter 1 (2002)
- Die Another Day (2005)
- Just Add Water (2006, with Mona J.)
- Man on Fire (2008)
- The Prototype (2010)
- Prototype 2 (2014).
