= N72 =

N72 may refer to:

- N72 (Long Island bus)
- London Buses route N72
- N72 road (Belgium)
- N72 road (Ireland)
- Nokia N72, a mobile phone
- Warwick Municipal Airport, in Orange County, New York, United States
