= New York State Route 17A =

State highway in Orange County, New York, US

New York State Route 17A
- Map of Orange County with NY 17A highlighted in red

Route information
- Auxiliary route of NY 17
- Maintained by NYSDOT
- Length: 24.76 mi (39.85 km)
- Existed: 1930–present

Major junctions
- West end: Future I-86 / US 6 / NY 17 / NY 17M / NY 207 in Goshen
- East end: NY 17 in Tuxedo

Location
- Country: United States
- State: New York
- Counties: Orange

Highway system
- New York Highways; Interstate; US; State; Reference; Parkways
← NY 17	→ NY 17B

New York State Route 17A (NY 17A) is a state highway in southern New York in the United States, entirely within Orange County. Its western terminus is located in the village of Goshen at a junction with NY 17 (Future I-86), and its eastern terminus is at another intersection with NY 17 located in Southfields. It runs concurrently with NY 94 from Warwick to Florida. It serves mainly to connect Warwick with the rest of the county. While it is an east–west route, many sections run in a more north–south orientation. Its circuitous route allows it to offer much scenery to drivers.

The Greenwood Lake–Goshen portion of NY 17A was originally designated as part of New York State Route 55 in the 1920s. South of Greenwood Lake, NY 55 used modern NY 210. NY 55 was split into NY 17A and NY 210 as part of the 1930 renumbering of state highways in New York. Initially, only NY 210 continued east from Greenwood Lake to Southfields; however, NY 17A was extended to Southfields by 1933, overlapping NY 210. The overlap was eliminated in 1982 when NY 210 was truncated to Greenwood Lake.

== Route description ==
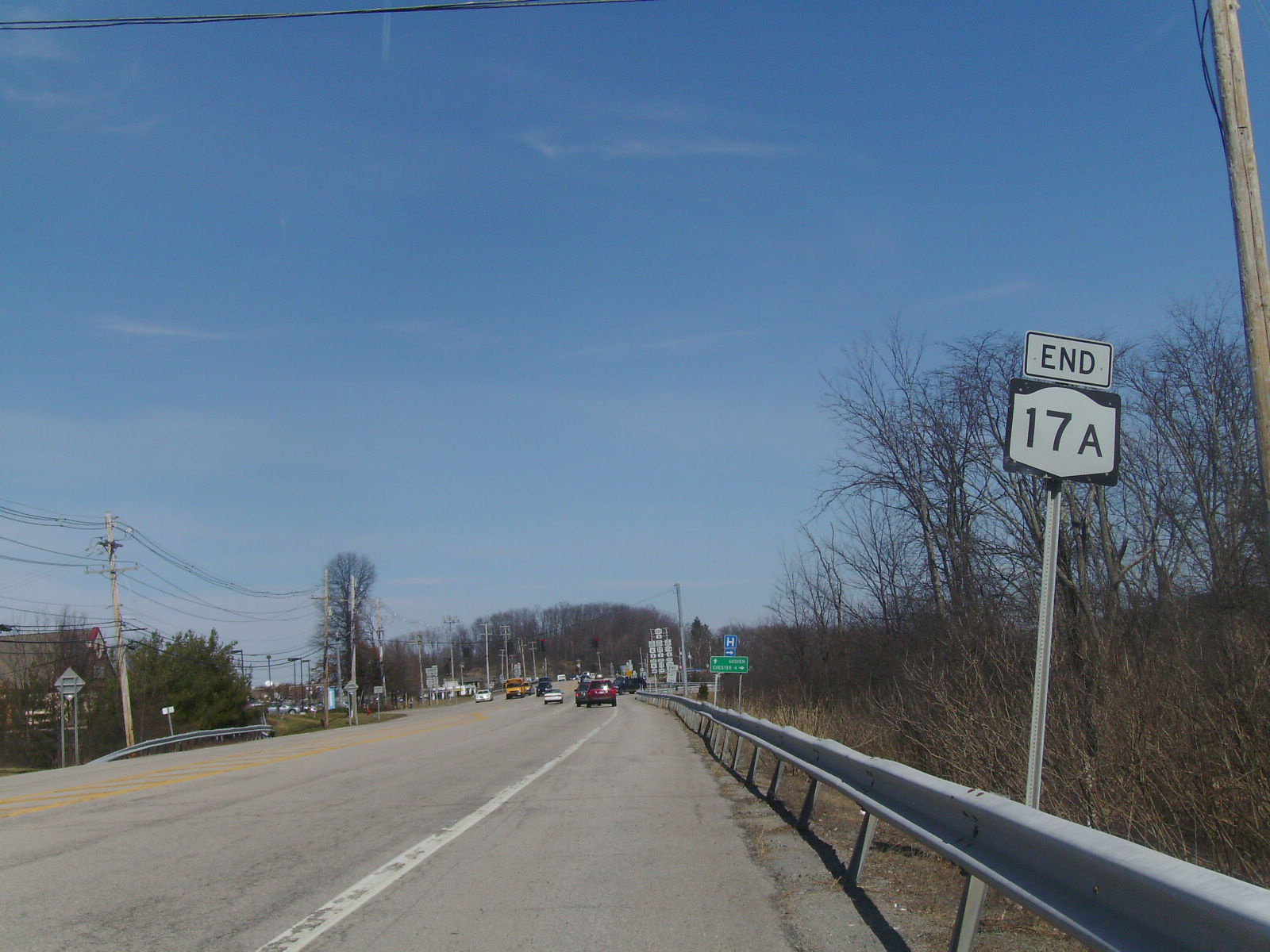
NY 17A at its northern terminus at exit 124 in Goshen

NY 17A begins just south of NY 17 exit 124 in the village of Goshen. At the traffic light with the southern on-ramp from NY 17 eastbound, NY 207 becomes NY 17A. The route quickly climbs to some of the hillier areas south of Goshen, offering views of not only Orange County's Black Dirt Region but Pochuck Mountain and High Point to the south in New Jersey. It then slowly descends past rolling meadows and farmland until it reaches the small village of Florida, where NY 94 comes in from the west shortly after the village border. The concurrent roads then become Florida's main street. Once out of the village, NY 17A and NY 94 begin to climb again, this time offering some panoramic views to the north, all the way to the Shawangunk Ridge and even the Catskill Mountains beyond them in clear enough weather. The road is surprisingly little developed in this area, with only one gas station between Florida and Warwick, its next stop, which likewise presents itself after a descent. Again, NY 17A and NY 94 serve as the bustling village's main street, longer this time and with many upscale boutiques in evidence. Many historic buildings line the road through Warwick. Near the southern end of the village, the two roads split, with NY 94 continuing toward New Jersey while NY 17A goes eastward.

The road begins to climb again over the next few miles, passing a county park and finally the small Mount Peter ski area before crossing the Appalachian Trail along the ridgecrest of Bellvale Mountain. From here it once again drops down and bends in a north–south direction to reach Greenwood Lake, where NY 210 leaves to go along the side of the lake to the state line.

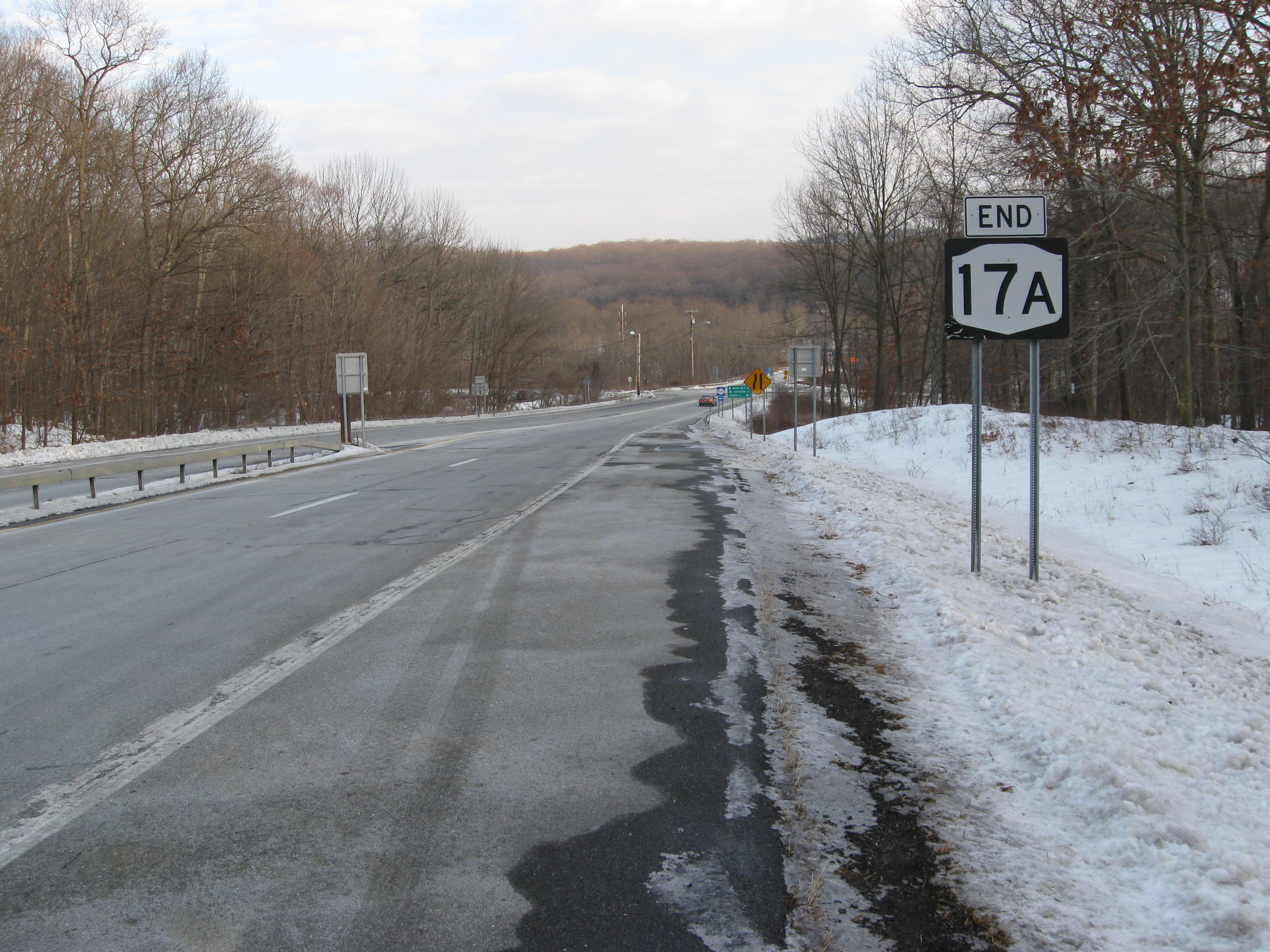
NY 17A ends here at NY 17 in Southfields

Leaving Greenwood Lake, NY 17A climbs once again to cross another ridge before descending and expanding to a four-lane expressway to pass through Sterling Forest and reach its eastern terminus at NY 17 in Southfields. The highway formerly continued as County Route 106 (CR 106) in Orange and Rockland counties east to that route's eastern terminus at U.S. Route 9W (US 9W) and US 202 in Stony Point. CR 106 was once part of NY 210 before it was truncated to NY 17A in Greenwood Lake.

== History ==
East of Bellvale, NY 17A follows the course of the Bellvale Turnpike, chartered 1810 to run from Bellvale to the Orange Turnpike. This road was still called the Monroe Turnpike by at late as the 1870s. NY 17A has bypassed most of this turnpike.

In the late 1920s, what is now NY 17A from Greenwood Lake to Goshen was designated as part of NY 55, a connector between NY 17 in Goshen and the New Jersey state line. In the 1930 renumbering of state highways in New York, NY 55 was incorporated into two longer routes: NY 210 from New Jersey to Greenwood Lake and NY 17A from Greenwood Lake to Goshen. The modern routing of NY 17A between Greenfield Lake and Southfields was originally only part of NY 210, which continued past NY 17 and into Rockland County. NY 17A was extended east to Southfields by 1933, completing the alternate loop of NY 17 and creating an overlap with NY 210.

In 1980, ownership and maintenance of NY 210 between NY 210 and the Rockland County line was transferred from the state of New York to Orange County. Two years later, all of NY 210 in Rockland County was given to the county. NY 210 was truncated to its current northern terminus in Greenwood Lake following the latter swap, eliminating the overlap with NY 17A.

== Major intersections ==
The entire route is in Orange County.

Location	mi	km	Destinations	Notes
Village of Goshen	0.00	0.00	NY 207 east – Goshen	Continuation east
Village of Goshen	0.00	0.00	Future I-86 / US 6 / NY 17 / NY 17M – Chester	Exit 124 on NY 17
Florida	4.49	7.23	NY 94 east / CR 25 west – Chester, Pine Island	Western end of NY 94 concurrency; eastern terminus of CR 25
Village of Warwick	10.99	17.69	NY 94 west – New Milford	Eastern end of NY 94 concurrency
Greenwood Lake	17.30	27.84	NY 210 south – West Milford, NJ	Northern terminus of NY 210
Tuxedo			Western end of limited-access section	
Tuxedo	24.76	39.85	NY 17 – Tuxedo, Harriman, Bear Mountain	Interchange; eastern terminus; hamlet of Southfields
1.000 mi = 1.609 km; 1.000 km = 0.621 mi: Concurrency terminus
