= Warwick (village), New York =

Warwick, New York
- Village
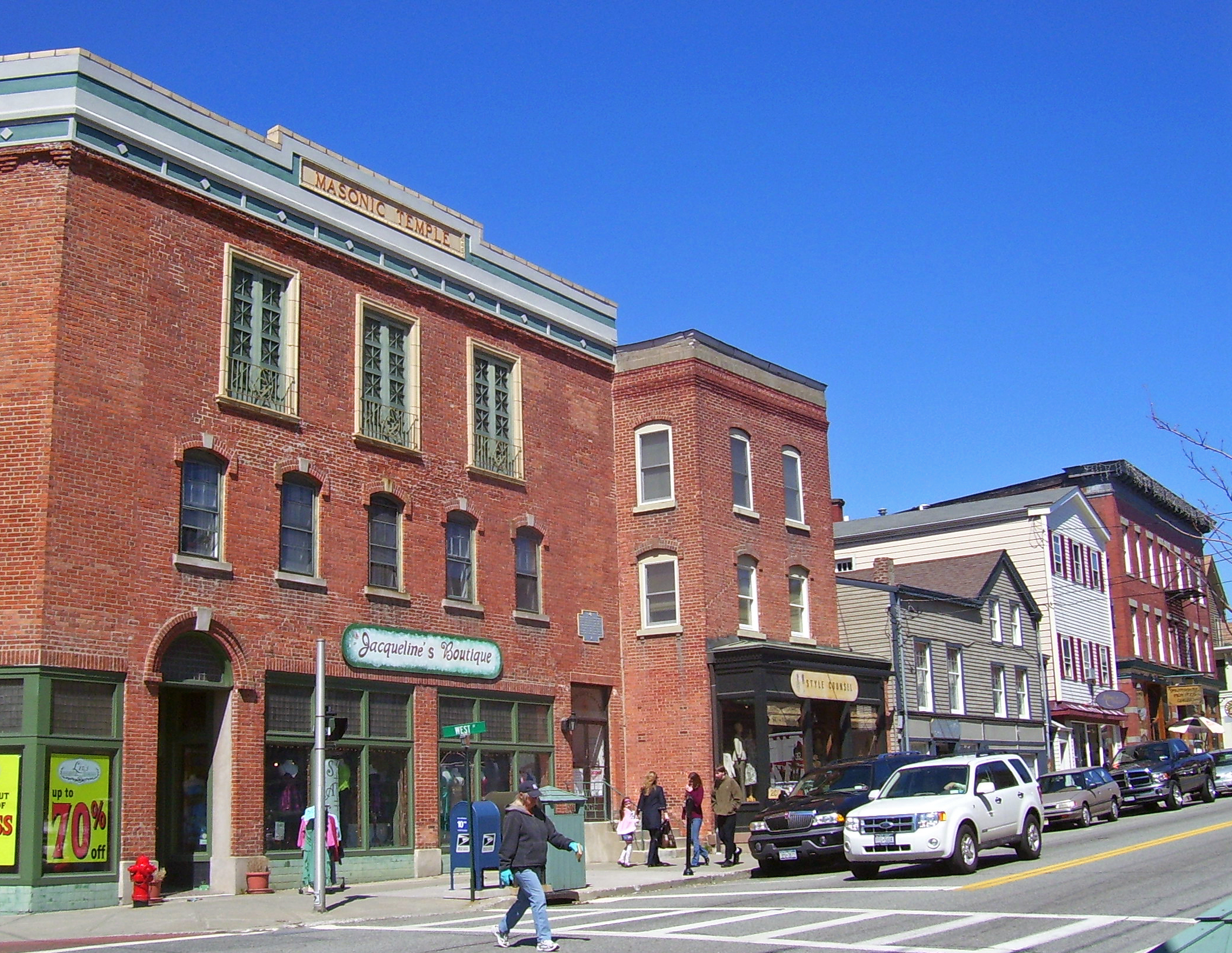
- Downtown Warwick, 2008

- Location in Orange County and the state of New York.

- Location within the state of New York
- Coordinates: 41°15′11″N 74°21′25″W
- Country: United States
- State: New York
- County: Orange
- Town: Warwick
- Incorporated: 1867

Government
  - Mayor: Michael J. Newhard

Area
  - Total: 2.43 sq mi (6.29 km^{2})
  - Land: 2.42 sq mi (6.28 km^{2})
  - Water: 0.0039 sq mi (0.01 km^{2})
- Elevation: 518 ft (158 m)

Population (2020)
  - Total: 6,652
  - Density: 2,742.0/sq mi (1,058.69/km^{2})
- Time zone: UTC-5 (Eastern (EST))
  - Summer (DST): UTC-4 (EDT)
- ZIP code: 10990
- Area code: 845
- FIPS code: 36-78355
- GNIS feature ID: 0968829
- Website: villageofwarwickny.gov

Warwick is a village in Orange County, New York, United States, in the southeastern section of the town of Warwick. The village's population was 6,652 at the time of the 2020 census. It is part of the Kiryas Joel–Poughkeepsie–Newburgh metropolitan area, which in turn is part of the New York–Newark–Bridgeport, NY-NJ-CT-PA Combined Statistical Area.

== History ==
Settled in the middle part of the 18th Century, the village grew from its agricultural roots as a stopover on the King's Highway between Philadelphia and Newburgh, New York. During the American War for Independence, British General Burgoyne and his army camped on the outskirts of the village after their defeat at the Battle of Saratoga. Also during the American Revolution, Martha Washington stayed at Baird's Tavern, now located on Main Street in the Village.

In 1859, Grinnell Burt along with other local businessmen met to form a new rail line from the Erie Railroad's main line at Greycourt to the village as a means of transporting milk and other agricultural products to market. The Warwick Valley Railroad was chartered on March 8, 1860, and the line was completed in 1862 functioning essentially as a 10-mile long branch of the 6-foot gauge Erie. Almost all of the commercial brick buildings in the village date to this period including the Dispatch Building and Demerest Hotel which were built to house passengers from the trains. When the line was extended to Belvidere, then to Allentown, the Warwick Valley Railroad was merged into the Lehigh and Hudson River Railway in 1882 with Warwick serving as the headquarters for the 90+ mile line for its entire history. The railyard first established at the South Street terminus was replaced first with a roundhouse and machine shop at Elm Street, then in 1910 with a full complex off of River Street (the present site of Jones Chemical). The L&HR served as a major "bridge line" of freight traffic between Pennsylvania and the enormous railyard at Maybrook, New York where freight would be forward to New England over the vitally important Poughkeepsie Railroad Bridge. With the advent of the age of the automobile, the small passenger business that existed dried up and the last passenger train was run between Warwick and Greycourt on July 8, 1939. The L&HR was the largest single employer in the village of Warwick, but with the decline of rail and the burning of the Poughkeepsie Bridge in May 1974, the L&HR was deemed irrelevant and the bankrupt railroad was folded into Conrail in 1976.

Without any link to a major highway, Warwick avoided the rapid development of other town in Orange County at the beginning of the 21st Century and maintains its small town charm to this day. one hundred and thirty acres (53 hectares) along Routes 94 and 17A in the center of the village are listed on the National Register of Historic Places as the Warwick Village Historic District. Buildings there range from the oldest in the village, the 1764 Shingle House, preserved and maintained by the Historical Society of the Town of Warwick, also known as the Warwick Historical Society, to large early 20th-century cottages built by weekend vacationers from New York City.

== Geography ==
Warwick is located at 41°15′11″N 74°21′24″W (41.25313, -74.356815).

According to the United States Census Bureau, the village has a total area of 2.2 sq mi (5.7 km^{2}), all land.

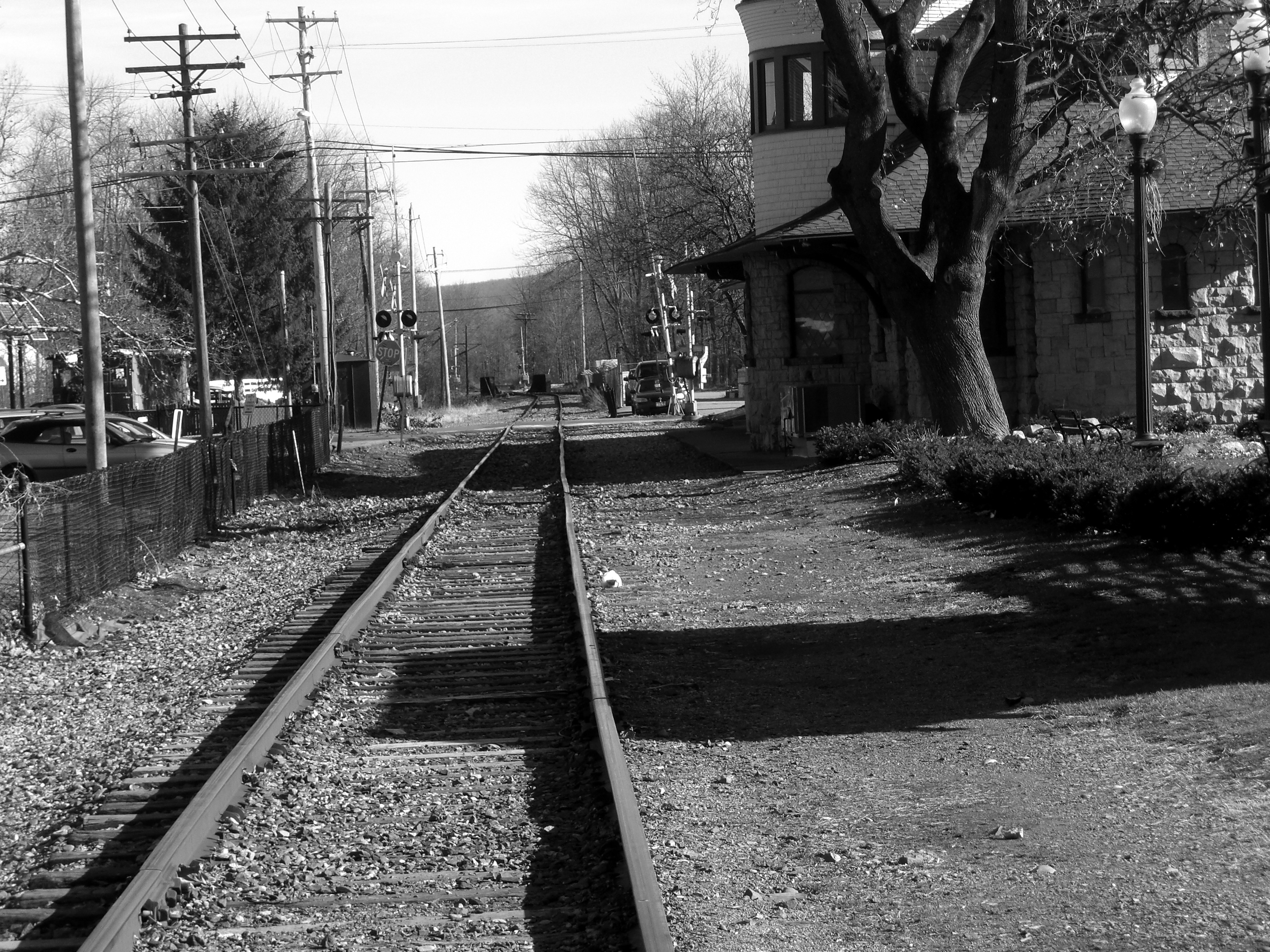
The former Warwick Lehigh and Hudson River Railway station

NY 94 and NY 17A intersect in the center of the village and connect Warwick to the villages of Florida and Greenwood Lake. County Routes 1A, 1B, and 13 lead into the village also. On the northern end of the village is St. Anthony Medical Center. With the termination of the passenger railroad, the only form of public transportation to New York City is NJ Transit buses, using either the 196 (express) or 197 (local) routes.

The state line between New York and New Jersey is four miles (6.4 km) west of the village. Hamlets surrounding the village include Amity, Bellvale, Wisner, Edenville, Greenwood Forest Farms, Little York, New Milford, Pine Island, and Sterling Forest.

== Demographics ==
Historical population
Census	Pop.	Note	%±
1870	938		—
1880	1,043		11.2%
1890	1,537		47.4%
1900	1,735		12.9%
1910	2,318		33.6%
1920	2,420		4.4%
1930	2,443		1.0%
1940	2,534		3.7%
1950	2,674		5.5%
1960	3,218		20.3%
1970	3,604		12.0%
1980	4,320		19.9%
1990	5,984		38.5%
2000	6,412		7.2%
2010	6,731		5.0%
2020	6,652		−1.2%
U.S. Decennial Census

As of the census of 2000, there were 6,412 people, 2,523 households, and 1,619 families residing in the village. The population density was 2,870.5 inhabitants per square mile (1,108.3/km^{2}). There were 2,615 housing units at an average density of 1,170.7/sq mi (452.0/km^{2}). The racial makeup of the village was 92.56% white, 3.26% black or African American, 0.19% Native American, 0.62% Asian, 0.03% Pacific Islander, 1.08% from other races, and 2.26% from two or more races. Hispanic or Latino of any race were 5.68% of the population.

There were 2,523 households, out of which 34.0% had children under the age of 18 living with them, 51.6% were married couples living together, 9.6% had a female householder with no husband present, and 35.8% were non-families. 31.9% of all households were made up of individuals, and 18.0% had someone living alone who was 65 years of age or older. The average household size was 2.46 and the average family size was 3.16.

In the village, the population was spread out, with 26.3% under the age of 18, 5.3% from 18 to 24, 28.0% from 25 to 44, 22.0% from 45 to 64, and 18.4% who were 65 years of age or older. The median age was 40 years. For every 100 females, there were 84.3 males. For every 100 females age 18 and over, there were 76.8 males.

The median income for a household in the village was $49,665, and the median income for a family was $62,984. Males had a median income of $56,641 versus $36,613 for females. The per capita income for the village was $24,648. About 3.7% of families and 4.4% of the population were below the poverty line, including 3.5% of those under age 18 and 10.9% of those age 65 or over.

== Education ==
It is in the Warwick Valley Central School District.
