= Warwick Advertiser =

Newspaper

The Warwick Advertiser is a weekly newspaper in Warwick, New York, United States.

Established in 1866 by Leonard Cox, by 1877 it reported a circulation of 1,200. As of 2017, it is owned by Straus News.
