= Charles Bartberger =

American architect

Charles Frederic Bartberger (May 29, 1824 – August 19, 1896) was a German American architect.

Charles F. Bartberger graduated from the Polytechnic Institute of Karlsruhe in 1843. He moved to the United States in 1845 and settled in Pittsburgh. After 1885 he was associated with architect Ernest G. W. Dietrich. Later he associated with his son Charles Matthias Bartberger (1850–1939).

Charles F. Bartberger designed more than 200 public buildings, including prominent buildings like Saint Michael's Roman Catholic Church & Rectory, St. Paul of the Cross Monastery, and the Mount de Chantal Visitation Academy. He designed the Pittsburgh Stock Exchange building, built 1903, at 333 Fourth Ave in Pittsburgh, Pennsylvania, which house the exchange from 1962 to 1974.

He was a member of the American Institute of Architects.

He died in the Western Pennsylvania Hospital from the injuries he received from being struck by a wagon.
