= Warwick Municipal Airport =

- IATA: none; ICAO: none; FAA LID: N72

Summary
- Airport type: Public
- Owner: Town of Warwick
- Serves: Warwick, New York
- Elevation AMSL: 540 ft / 165 m
- Coordinates: 41°17′15″N 074°17′14″W

Map
- Location of airport in New York N72 (the United States)

Runways
Direction	Length		Surface
Direction	ft	m	Surface
3R/21L	2,150	655	Asphalt
3L/21R	2,100	640	Turf
8/26	2,250	686	Turf

Statistics (2011)
- Aircraft operations: 4,500
- Based aircraft: 41
- Source: Federal Aviation Administration

Warwick Municipal Airport (FAA LID: N72) is a public use airport located three nautical miles (6 km) northeast of Warwick, a village in the Town of Warwick, Orange County, New York, United States. The airport is owned by the Town of Warwick and has been in operation since 1946. It is included in the National Plan of Integrated Airport Systems for 2011–2015, which categorized it as a general aviation facility.

== Facilities and aircraft ==
Warwick Municipal Airport covers an area of 133 acres (54 ha) at an elevation of 540 feet (165 m) above mean sea level. It has one asphalt paved runway designated 3R/21L which measures 2,150 by 28 feet (655 x 9 m); it also has two turf runways: 3L/21R is 2,100 by 50 feet (640 x 15 m) and 8/26 is 2,250 by 80 feet (686 x 24 m).

For the 12-month period ending October 6, 2011, the airport had 4,500 general aviation aircraft operations, an average of 12 per day. At that time there were 41 single-engine aircraft based at this airport.

== See also ==
- List of airports in New York
