= Bill Pennington =

American journalist and author

- Born: William Mark Pennington; December 12, 1956
- Education: Boston University
- Occupations: Sports journalist and author
- Employer: The New York Times
- Spouse: Joyce Lynn Hand (m. 1990)
- Children: 3

William Mark Pennington (born December 12, 1956) is an American journalist, sportswriter and author. A reporter for The New York Times since 1997, Pennington has become best known for his sports journalism on golf, skiing, baseball, football, and other sports.

== Career ==
Pennington began his career at the Bristol Press in Bristol, Connecticut, then worked for the Associated Press in Boston, the Providence Journal, the Stamford Advocate and The Record, where he was a beat writer for the New York Yankees and later a syndicated columnist. For five years at The New York Times, he was the beat writer covering the New York Giants. He also received acclaim for his coverage of multiple summer and winter Olympic Games.

In 2008, Pennington began starring in golf videos and writing the weekly "On Par" golf column in the Times. In 2015, Pennington authored The New York Times best seller Billy Martin: Baseball's Flawed Genius.

Pennington is a 15-time finalist and seven-time winner of the Associated Press sports editors national writing award, writing stories about overuse injuries in young athletes, unethical medical practices in professional sports, a profile of ski racer Lindsey Vonn and Title IX abuses. His 2009 series examining the actual monetary value of an NCAA athletic scholarship won a Deadline Club award from the Society of Professional Journalists in 2009.

== Personal life ==
Raised in central Connecticut, Pennington graduated from Farmington High School and Boston University. He lives in Warwick, New York, with his wife, Joyce, and three children.

== Bibliography ==
=== Books ===
- Chumps to Champs: How the Worst Teams in Yankees History Led to the '90s Dynasty (2019) ISBN 978-1328849854
- Billy Martin: Baseball's Flawed Genius (2015) ISBN 978-0544709034
- On Par: The Everyday Golfer's Survival Guide (2012) ISBN 978-0547548449
- The Heisman: Great American Stories of the Men Who Won (2004) ISBN 978-0060554712
- The Winning Spirit (1992)

=== Notable articles ===
- Pennington, Bill (4 February 2015). "Willie Wood Made the Most Memorable Play of Super Bowl I. He Has No Recollection". The New York Times. Reports on Hall of Fame defensive back Willie Wood and Hall of Fame quarterback Len Dawson, NFL pioneers whose post-playing careers diverged wildly due in part to Wood's repeated head injuries and subsequent memory loss issues.
- Pennington, Bill (28 June 2013). "N.F.L. Star and Murder Victim - Where Diverse Paths Crossed". The New York Times. An in-depth investigation on the life of former New England Patriots tight end Aaron Hernandez and his suspected involvement in the murder of Odin Lloyd.
- Pennington, Bill (2005–2006). "The Athlete's Edge". The New York Times. A nine-part series that examines how Haverford coaches decide whom to support in the admissions process, how the athletics and admissions offices interact, and how potential recruits view the system.
- Pennington, Bill (10 February 2010). "Vonn's at Ease, but Never Far From Edge". The New York Times. Reports on Lindsey Vonn's rise to the top of the ski racing world.
- Pennington, Bill (16 May 2003). "34 Years Later, A Coach's Sweetest Victory". The New York Times. Reports on former New York Giants head coach Jim Fassel's journey to reconnect with his son, John Mathieson, put up for adoption in 1969.
