= Amity, Orange County, New York =

Amity, New York
- hamlet
- Location of Amity in New York
- Coordinates: 41°16′05″N 74°27′18″W
- Country: United States
- State: New York
- County: Orange
- Town: Warwick
- Elevation: 505 ft (154 m)
- Time zone: UTC-5 (Eastern (EST))
  - Summer (DST): UTC-4 (EDT)
- ZIP code: 10990
- Area code: 845
- GNIS feature ID: 942435
- Other name: Pochuck

Amity is a hamlet in the town of Warwick, New York, United States. It is located between Edenville and Pine Island, near the New Jersey state line. Amity is served by the Amity Station of the Pine Island Fire Department. The Amity Presbyterian Society was founded in 1796 and, after 213 years, celebrated its last service on April 26, 2009. The church, located on Newport Bridge road near Amity Road, became home to Vision Community Church until December 2010. Vision moved to the Park Avenue Elementary school in Warwick, NY after the Amity property was put up for sale.
