= New York State Route 94 =

State highway in Orange County, New York, US

New York State Route 94
- 94th Infantry Division Memorial Highway
- Map of the Lower Hudson Valley with NY 94 highlighted in red

Route information
- Maintained by NYSDOT
- Length: 32.52 mi (52.34 km)
- History: Designated NY 45 in 1930; renumbered to NY 94 in on January 1, 1949

Major junctions
- West end: Route 94 at the New Jersey state line in Warwick
- NY 17A from Warwick to Florida; Future I-86 / US 6 / NY 17 / NY 17M in Chester; NY 208 in Washingtonville; NY 32 / NY 300 at Vails Gate
- East end: US 9W in New Windsor

Location
- Country: United States
- State: New York
- Counties: Orange

Highway system
- New York Highways; Interstate; US; State; Reference; Parkways
← NY 93	→ I-95

New York State Route 94 (NY 94) is a state highway entirely within Orange County in southern New York. The western terminus is at the New York–New Jersey state line, where it continues as New Jersey's Route 94 for another 46 miles (74 km) to Columbia, New Jersey. Its eastern terminus is located at U.S. Route 9W (US 9W) in New Windsor. From Warwick to Florida, NY 94 is concurrent with NY 17A. The entirety of NY 94 is known as the 94th Infantry Division Memorial Highway.

NY 94 was originally designated as NY 45 in 1930. It was renumbered to NY 94 on January 1, 1949. The portion of the route between Warwick and Florida was part of NY 55 during the late 1920s.

== Route description ==
NY 94 begins at the New Jersey–New York state line in the town of Warwick as a continuation of Route 94. NY 94 proceeds northeast through a rural section of Warwick, soon crossing into a residential neighborhood after crossing the Double Kill. Paralleling Wawayanda Creek, the route enters the hamlet of New Milford, where it junctions with the northern terminus of County Route 21 (CR 21 or Warwick Turnpike), which connects to New Jersey and Upper Greenwood Lake. NY 94 continues northeast out of New Milford and crosses a junction with CR 1A. Just north of the junction, the route enters the village of Warwick and intersects with NY 17A (Galloway Road) in front of the Warwick Valley Country Club.

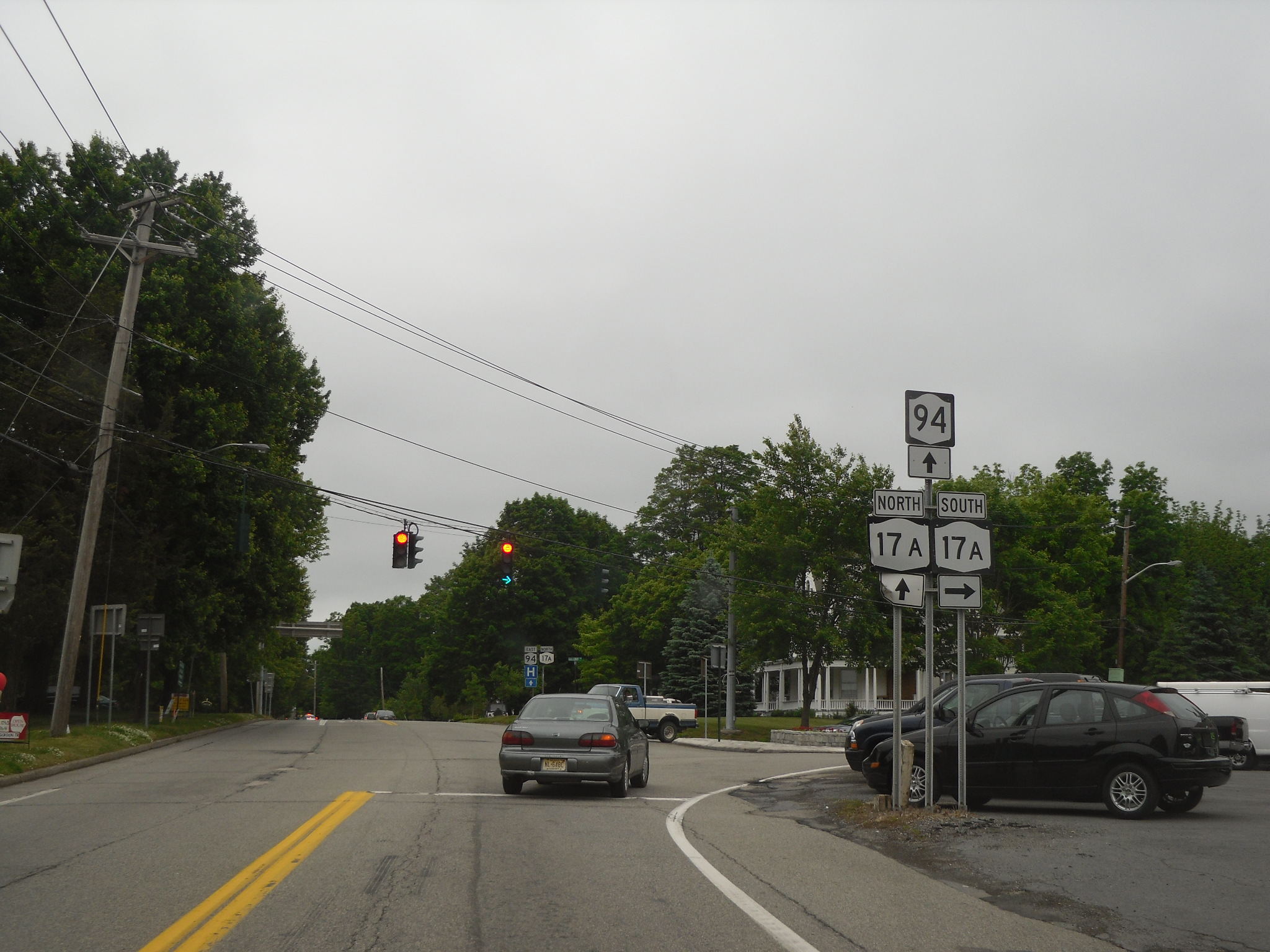
NY 94 northbound at NY 17A in the village of Warwick

NY 94 and NY 17A proceed north through Warwick as a two-lane residential street known as Oakland Avenue, crossing tracks currently used by the New York, Susquehanna and Western Railway in the center of the village. North of the junction with Grand Street, NY 94 and NY 17A cross the St. Anthony Community Hospital, and leave the village of Warwick. Now outside of the village, the routes continue north as a two-lane residential road, winding south of Glenemere Lake and gaining the moniker of Seward Highway. Shortly after gaining the moniker, NY 94 and NY 17A cross into the village of Florida and changes to South Main Street. Through Florida, NY 94 and NY 17A remain a residential village street, reaching the center of the village near Bridge Street.

Paralleling the former right-of-way of the Erie Railroad's Pine Island Branch, NY 94 and NY 17A reach a junction with Meadow Road, where NY 17A continues north on North Main Street and NY 94 turns northeast on Randall Street. Leaving the village of Florida (and the town of Warwick), NY 94 enters the town of Goshen, crossing through the hamlet of Randelville, paralleling Quaker Creek from a distance to the north. Winding eastward out of Randelville, NY 94 crosses into the town of Chester, gaining the moniker of Summerville Way. The two-lane road becomes a mix of rural and residential, soon reaching the village of Chester. After a turn at West Avenue, NY 94 bends into exit 126 of NY 17 and US 6 (the Quickway).

After crossing the diamond interchange with the Quickway, NY 94 crosses a junction with NY 17M (Brookside Avenue). Darting east for two blocks on Academy Avenue, NY 94 turns north at Main Street and crosses through a residential section of the village. Turning into High Street, NY 94 crosses over the abandoned alignment of the Erie Railroad main line, bypassing the commercial center of the village. After passing numerous residences through the village, NY 94 soon leaves the village of Chester before crossing the Chester-Blooming Grove town line into latter town about less than a mile from the village of Chester. Turning northeast, the route crosses over Cromline Creek and reaches a junction with CR 51 (Craigville Road).

Crossing northeast through the town of Blooming Grove, NY 94 parallels Saatterly Creek and the abandoned alignment of the Erie Railroad's Newburgh Branch through the hamlet of Blooming Grove. Remaining a residential roadway, the route turns north and crosses over Moodna Creek into the village of Washingtonville. Crossing over the abandoned branch, NY 94 gains the moniker of West Main Street and passes Washingtonville High School. At the junction with South Street, NY 94 reaches a junction with NY 208 (Goshen Avenue). NY 94 now turns east along East Main, remaining a two-lane residential street through Washingtonville along Moodna Creek. Turning northeast near Locust Street, the route soon leaves Washingtonville, dropping the East Main Street moniker.

Continuing east out of Washingtonville, NY 94 almost immediately enters the hamlet of Salisbury Mills, crossing a junction with CR 20 (Orrs Mills Road). Remaining a two-lane residential street through Salisbury Mills, NY 94 passes south of Beaver Dam Lake and soon into the town of Cornwall. Just east of an old alignment of NY 94, the route passes the entrance to the Salisbury Mills-Cornwall Metro-North Railroad station. Crossing under the Port Jervis Line and northern end of the Moodna Viaduct, the route winds northeast through the rural parts of Cornwall. The route begins to become a more residential road as it enters the hamlet of Vails Gate. Passing north of Cornwall Central High School, NY 94 soon crosses under the New York State Thruway (I-87) and enters the town of New Windsor.

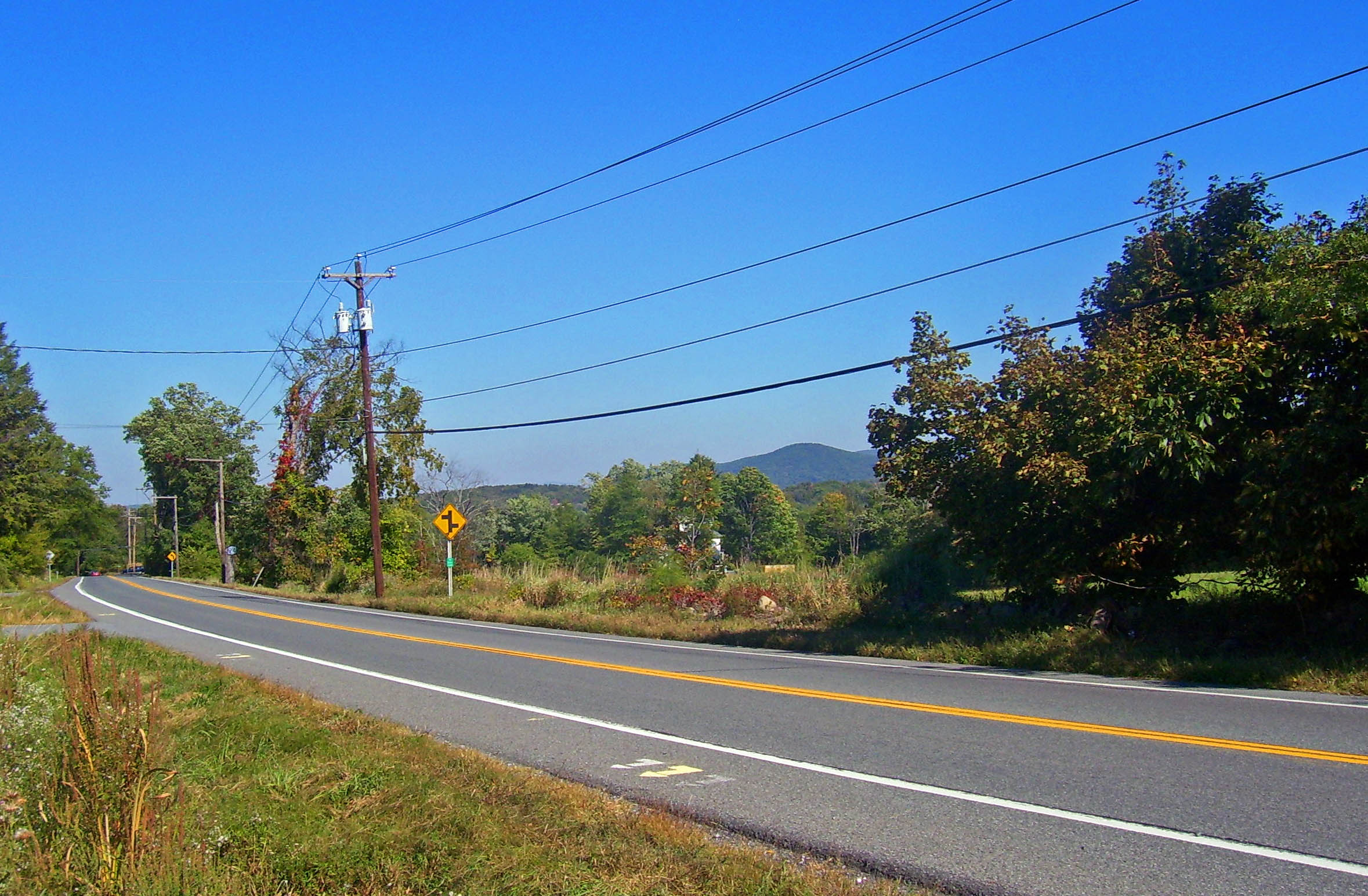
NY 94 west of the village of Washingtonville in Blooming Grove

Through New Windsor, NY 94 crosses into the center of Vails Gate, reaching a junction with NY 32 (Windsor Highway) and NY 300 (Temple Hill Road). East of the junction, NY 94 continues through New Windsor as Blooming Grove Turnpike. The route passes through multiple housing developments until reaching a junction with Quassaick Avenue in New Windsor. Here, NY 94 turns north onto the Quassaick, a two-lane residential street, passing east of Woodlawn Cemetery near the junction with CR 69 (Union Avenue). Continuing north through New Windsor, NY 94 reaches a junction with US 9W, where the NY 94 designation terminates and US 9W gains the Quassaick Avenue moniker.

== History ==
The segment of modern NY 94 between Warwick and Florida was originally designated as part of NY 55 in the late 1920s. In the 1930 renumbering of state highways in New York, NY 55 was renumbered to NY 17A west of Greenwood Lake. The Warwick–Florida portion of the route also became part of NY 45, a new route extending from the New Jersey state line to Vails Gate via Warwick, Florida, and Washingtonville. At Vails Gate (NY 32), the road changed designations to NY 307 and continued northeast to Newburgh. NY 307 became part of an extended NY 45 by the following year. In the early 1940s, NY 94 was assigned to Chestnut Ridge Road and Main Street in Rockland County. The NY 45 and NY 94 designations were swapped on January 1, 1949, placing both routes on their modern alignments.

Both NY 94 and most of New Jersey's Route 94 have been dedicated in honor of the 94th Infantry Division from World War II. In New York, the road is known as the "94th Infantry Division Memorial Highway"; in New Jersey, it is named the "W.W. II 94th Infantry Division Highway".

== Major intersections ==
The entire route is in Orange County.

Location	mi	km	Destinations	Notes
Town of Warwick	0.00	0.00	Route 94 south – Hamburg	Continuation into New Jersey
Village of Warwick	3.71	5.97	NY 17A south (Galloway Road) – Greenwood Lake	Southern end of NY 17A concurrency
Florida	10.21	16.43	NY 17A north (North Main Street) – Goshen, Pine Island	Northern end of NY 17A concurrency
Village of Chester	14.40	23.17	Future I-86 / US 6 / NY 17 – Goshen, Monroe	Exit 126 on NY 17
Village of Chester	14.57	23.45	NY 17M (Brookside Avenue) – Goshen, Monroe	
Washingtonville	22.85	36.77	NY 208 (Goshen Avenue) – Monroe, Maybrook	
Town of New Windsor	29.10	46.83	NY 32 (Windsor Highway) / NY 300 north (Temple Hill Road) – Newburgh, Highland Mills	Southern terminus of NY 300; hamlet of Vails Gate
Town of New Windsor	32.52	52.34	US 9W (Quassaick Avenue)	Northern terminus; hamlet of New Windsor
1.000 mi = 1.609 km; 1.000 km = 0.621 mi: Concurrency terminus
