= Frederick Franck =

Dutch painter

- Born: 12 April 1909; Maastricht, The Netherlands
- Died: 5 June 2006 (aged 97); Warwick, New York, United States
- Known for: Sculpture, Painting, Drawing

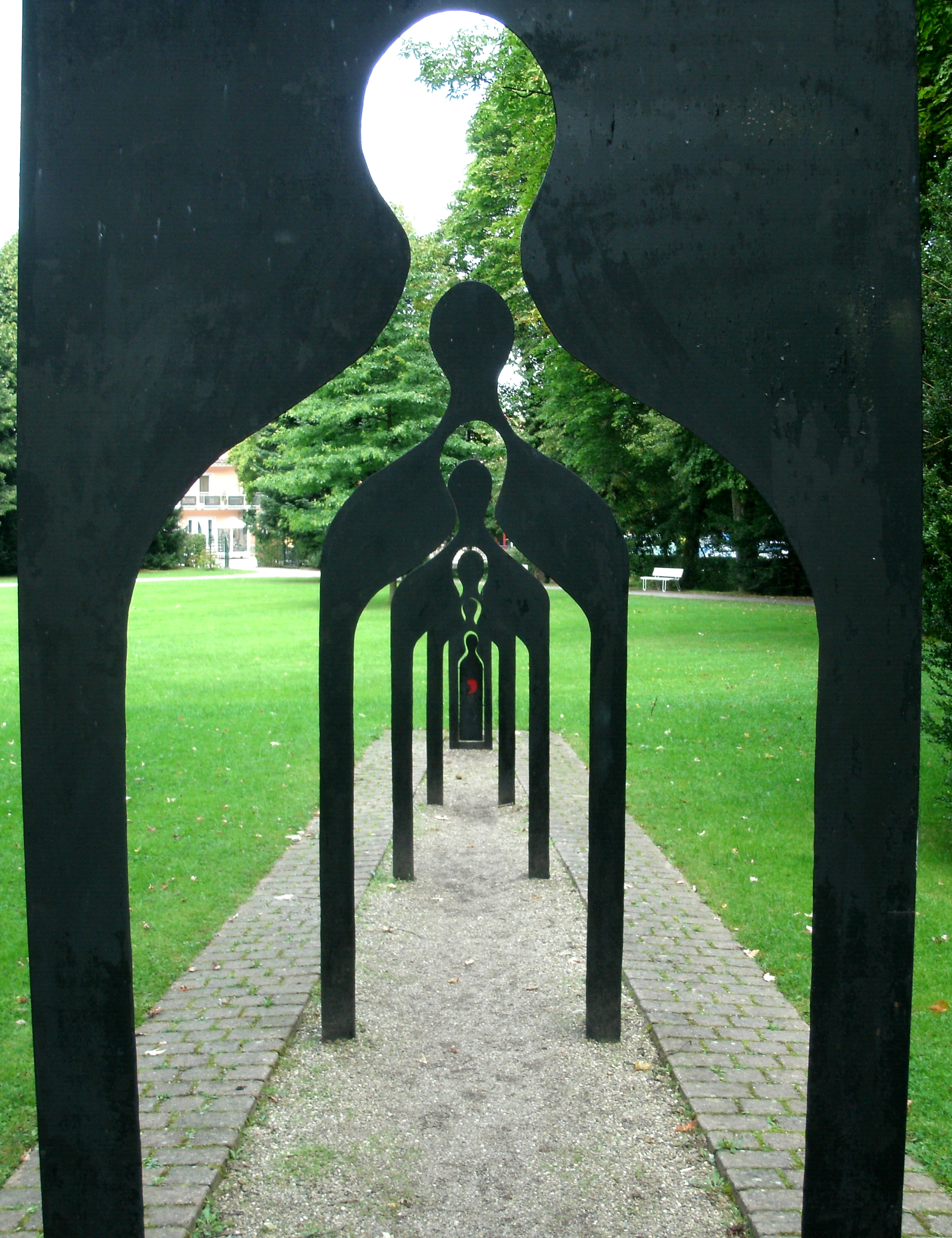
Sculpture Seven Generations in the spa gardens of Bad Herrenalb

Frederick Sigfred Franck (April 12, 1909 – June 5, 2006) was a painter, sculptor, and author of more than 30 books on Buddhism and other subjects, who was known for his interest in human spirituality. He became a United States citizen in 1945. He was a dental surgeon by trade, and worked with Dr. Albert Schweitzer in Africa from 1958 to 1961.

His sculptures are in the collections of the Museum of Modern Art, the Whitney Museum of American Art, the Fogg Art Museum, the Tokyo National Museum, and the Cathedral of St. John the Divine.

His major creation was a sculpture garden and park adjacent to his home in Warwick, New York, which he called Pacem in Terris ("Peace on Earth"). In 1959, he and his wife, Claske Berndes Franck, purchased the six-acre property, the site of an old grist mill which had become a dumping ground, for $800. They opened Pacem in Terris to the public in 1966. Dr. Franck dedicated it to Dr. Albert Schweitzer, Pope John XXIII, and the Buddhist teacher D.T. Suzuki. More than 70 sculptures adorn the property, which is now operated by a nonprofit foundation.

== Bibliography ==
- Messenger of the Heart: The Book of Angelus Silesius, with observations by the ancient Zen masters, (World Wisdom, 2005) ISBN 978-0-941532-70-9
- The Buddha Eye: An Anthology of the Kyoto School and its Contemporaries, (World Wisdom, 2004) ISBN 978-0-941532-59-4
- What Matters: Spiritual Nourishment for Head and Heart, (Skylight Paths Publishing, 2004) ISBN 978-1-59473-013-9
- Ode to the Human Face: Seeing/Molding the Human Face As Meditation, (Codhill Press, 2004) ISBN 978-1-930337-12-1
- A Passion for Seeing: On Being an Image Maker, (Codhill Press, 2003) ISBN 978-1-930337-06-0
- A Zen Book of Hours, (Codhill Press, 2003) ISBN 978-1-930337-13-8
- Seeing Venice: An Eye in Love : An Inner Travelogue With 94 Drawings, (Codhill Press, 2002) ISBN 978-1-930337-04-6
- What Does It Mean to Be Human?, (St. Martin's Griffin, 2001) ISBN 978-0-312-27101-5
- Pacem in Terris: A Love Story, (Codhill Press, 2000) ISBN 978-1-930337-02-2
- Fingers Pointing Toward the Sacred: A Twentieth Century Pilgrimage on the Eastern and Western Way, (Beacon Point Press, 1994) ISBN 978-1-56907-006-2
- Zen Seeing, Zen Drawing: Meditation in Action, (Bantam Books, 1993) ISBN 978-0-553-37146-8
- A Little Compendium on That Which Matters, (St Martins Press, 1993) ISBN 978-0-312-09327-3
- To Be Human Against All Odds: On the Reptile Still Active in Our Brain (Nanzan Studies in Religion and Culture), (Asian Humanities Pr, 1991) ISBN 978-0-89581-945-1
- Life Drawing Life: On Seeing/Drawing the Human, (Great River Books, 1989) ISBN 978-0-915556-19-9
- Echoes from the Bottomless Well, (Vintage, 1985) ISBN 978-0-394-72995-4
- Art As a Way: A Return to the Spiritual Roots, (Crossroad Publishing Company, 1981) ISBN 978-0-8245-0076-4
- EveryOne: the timeless Myth of "Everyman" reborn, (Wildwood House Ltd, 1979) ISBN 0-7045-0347-6
- The Awakened Eye, (Vintage, 1979) ISBN 978-0-394-74021-8
- An encounter with Oomoto "The great origin": A faith rooted in the ancient mysticism and the traditional arts of Japan, (Cross Currents, 1975)
- Christ Equals Buddha, (Wildwood Ho, 1974) ISBN 978-0-7045-0130-0
- Zen of Seeing: Seeing/Drawing as Meditation, (Vintage, 1973) ISBN 978-0-394-71968-9
- Simenon's Paris, (Dial Press, 1970)
- Exploding church;: From Catholicism to Catholicism, (Delacorte Press, 1968)
- My Eye is in Love: Revelations on the Act of Seeing by Drawing, (Macmillan, 1963)
- African Sketchbook, (Peter Davies, 1962)
- Days with Albert Schweitzer, (Peter Davies, 1959)
- Open Wide, Please!, (Peter Davies, 1957)
