= E. G. W. Dietrich =

American architect (1857–1924)

Ernest George Washington Dietrich, AIA (February 22, 1857 – December 24, 1924) was an American architect. Born and raised in Pittsburgh, Pennsylvania, Dietrich relocated to New York City in 1886 where he practiced for nearly forty years. His work included the design of churches, libraries, hotels, commercial and public buildings, but he is most highly regarded for his residential designs in the shingle, colonial revival, and arts and crafts styles. In cooperation with furniture designer Gustav Stickley, Dietrich designed the first "Craftsman House" published in The Craftsman magazine in May 1903.

== Early life ==
E. G. W. Dietrich was the oldest of six children born to German immigrants Jacob and Johanna (Roenigk) Dietrich. He graduated from Duff's Business College and attended the Western College of Pennsylvania, now the University of Pittsburgh.

== Career ==
E. G. W. Dietrich began his architectural training at the firm of James W. Drum and David I. Kuhn in Pittsburgh. In the fall of 1881, he moved briefly to Brooklyn, New York and published several of his designs in architectural periodicals at this time; however, by September 1882, he had returned to Pittsburgh to work for architect James T. Steen.

In 1883, Dietrich formed a partnership with Charles M. Bartberger (1850–1939), the son of well-known Pittsburgh architect Charles F. Bartberger. The firm of Bartberger and Dietrich soon became successful receiving commissions for churches, schools, public buildings, and houses. While most of their projects were in Western Pennsylvania, Dietrich designed several notable houses in Cincinnati, Ohio, and Warwick, New York. In Warwick, his "picturesque" designs for side-by-side houses for future mayor Clinton Wheeler Wisner and his cousin Louise E. Wisner attracted much attention. With prominent contacts and the promise of future commissions on the East Coast, Dietrich ended his partnership with Bartberger and moved his practice to New York City in the fall of 1886 setting up an office at 294 Broadway.

=== Shingle Style ===
While Dietrich's earliest designs were typical of the late Victorian period, he soon found his voice designing structures with dramatic lines, minimal ornament, and using natural materials. For his later Shingle Style designs, Dietrich combined gambrel-roofed forms with low turrets and arched openings. In his book The Architecture of the American Summer, The Flowering of the Shingle Style, Professor of Architectural History at Yale University Vincent Scully noted Dietrich's mastery of the Shingle Style and featured several of his representative designs.

=== Colonial Revival ===
Dietrich designed his own home in the Colonial Revival style. Completed in the spring of 1891, "Sandanona" stood on Bay Parkway in Bensonhurst-by-the Sea, a private community on the shore of New York's Lower Bay. An early proponent of the Colonial Revival style, his designs predated the 1893 World's Columbian Exposition credited with popularizing the style. While the overall massing of the houses Dietrich designed in this style appear ordered and symmetrical, the asymmetrical floorplans are a continuation from his Shingle Style work. As was typical for the time, Dietrich worked in both styles often blurring style boundaries and combining elements of each.

=== Arts and Crafts ===
Gustav Stickley promoted the Arts and Crafts movement in the United States through his furniture designs and by founding The Craftsman magazine in October 1901. The Arts and Crafts ideals of unnecessary ornament; local, natural materials; and fine workmanship were a natural fit with Dietrich's own ideals and design style. In the February and April 1903 editions of The Craftsman, Dietrich's "The Cottage Quality" presented views, floorplans, and an essay describing the virtues and thoughts behind his design. Then in May 1903, the magazine published the first "Craftsman House" a design by Dietrich in cooperation with Stickley. Featuring an essay and drawings by Dietrich including an exterior view, floor plans, and detailed interior views showcasing Stickley furniture, this was the first time this term had been used in the magazine and was the precursor to the "Craftsman Homes" series starting in 1904.

Dietrich continued to advance and refine his work in the Arts and Crafts style. Societal changes leading up to and following World War I resulted in fewer large country house commissions, and Dietrich changed his focus to more modest residences, churches, and other public buildings.

== Professional partnerships and collaborations ==
Throughout his career, Dietrich practiced in partnership or collaboration with several architects including:

Charles M. Bartberger; A. Morris Stuckert; Manly N. Cutter; Henry La Pointe; Arthur H. Smith; and Julius J. Diemer

== Personal life and death ==
On October 12, 1884, E. G. W. Dietrich married Eliza Estelle Melhorn (1858–1924) the daughter of Lutheran minister Rev. John K. Melhorn who officiated the ceremony. The Dietrich family grew to include six sons. Eliza Estelle Dietrich died on April 30, 1924. On December 24, 1924, E. G. W. Dietrich suffered a fatal heart attack while waiting for a Long Island Railroad train at the Freeport, NY station near his home. Interment of Dietrich, his wife, and sons Emerson and Krotel is in Green-wood Cemetery, Brooklyn, NY.

== Associations ==
American Institute of Architects, Brooklyn Chapter

Fine Arts Federation of New York

== Selected works ==
Image	Building	Year	Location
	George A. MacBeth House	1884	Pittsburgh, PA
	"Dolce Domum" Louise E. Wisner House	1884	Warwick, NY
	"Fieldstone" Thomas E. Jones House	C. 1887	Scranton, PA
	"Sandanona" E. G. W. Dietrich House	1891	Bensonhurst-by-the-Sea, NY
	John Mollenhauer House	1893	Bay Shore, NY
	"Hearthstone" E. Starr Sanford House	1895	Danbury, CT
	"Hallhurst" Frederick P. Hall House	1896	Jamestown, NY
	Sylvanus L. Schoonmaker House later William W. Coriell Mansion	1896	Plainfield, NJ
	Robert N. Marvin House	1897	Jamestown, NY
	Red Swan Inn	1902	Warwick, NY
	Craftsman House	1903	
	Dr. George Sandhusen House	C. 1915	Garden City, NY
	Remodeled Hay Mow into Bungalow	C. 1917	near Lyme, CT
