= Greenwood Lake, New York =

- Village
- Village of Greenwood Lake
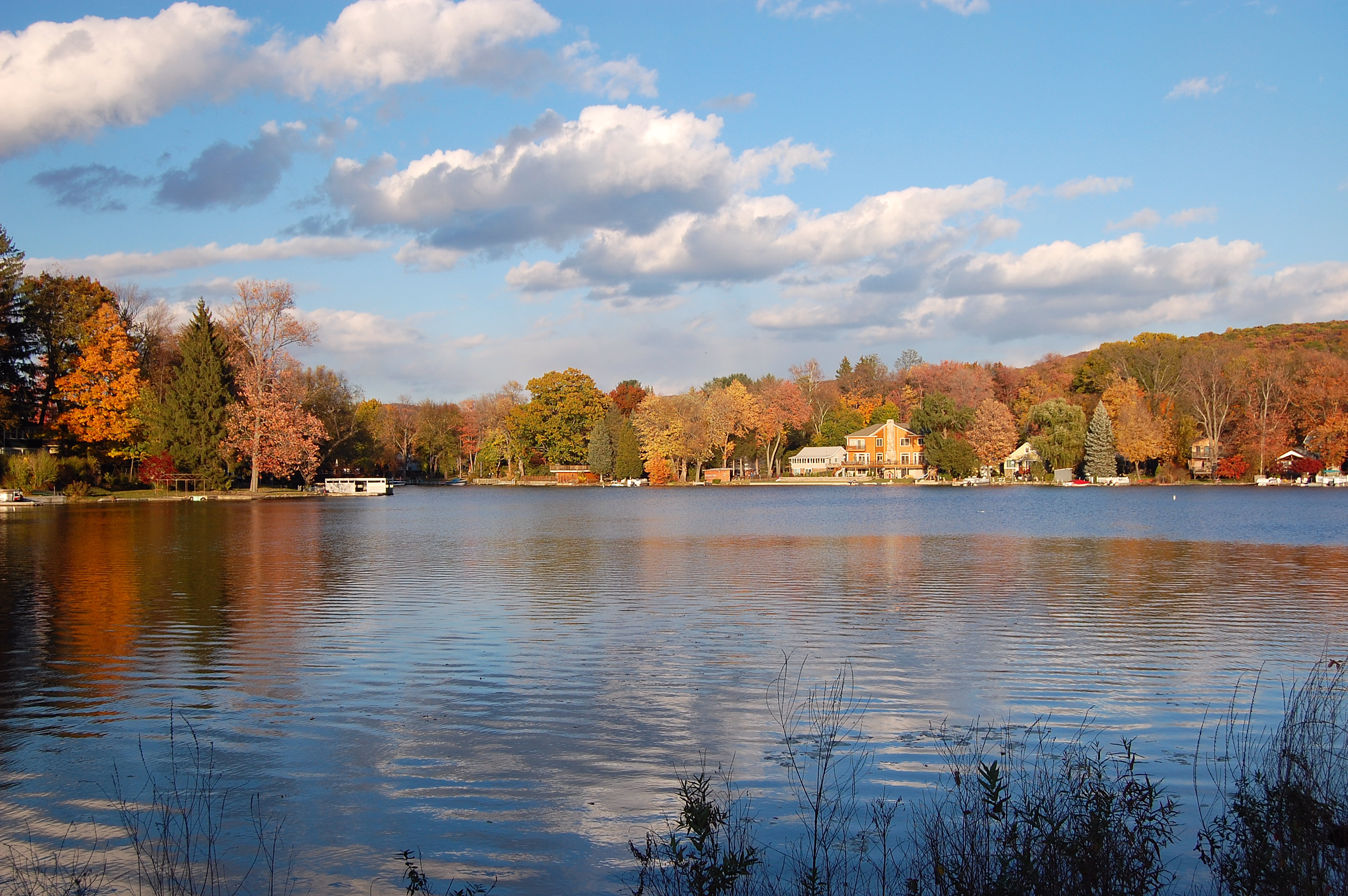
- East arm of Greenwood Lake

- Location in Orange County and the state of New York.

- Location within the state of New York
- Coordinates: 41°13′21″N 74°17′23″W
- Country: United States
- State: New York
- County: Orange

Area
  - Total: 2.45 sq mi (6.34 km^{2})
  - Land: 2.02 sq mi (5.24 km^{2})
  - Water: 0.42 sq mi (1.09 km^{2})
- Elevation: 630 ft (192 m)

Population (2020)
  - Total: 2,994
  - Density: 1,478.9/sq mi (571.02/km^{2})
- Time zone: UTC-5 (Eastern (EST))
  - Summer (DST): UTC-4 (EDT)
- ZIP code: 10925
- Area code: 845
- FIPS code: 36-30752
- GNIS feature ID: 2390873
- Website: villageofgreenwoodlake.gov

Greenwood Lake is a village in Orange County, New York, United States, in the southern part of the town of Warwick. As of the 2020 census, the population of the village was 2,994. It is part of the Poughkeepsie–Newburgh–Middletown, NY Metropolitan Statistical Area as well as the larger New York–Newark–Bridgeport Combined Statistical Area.

== History ==
Greenwood Lake was settled by Europeans as a farming community in the 1700s in the area of an earlier village occupied by the Munsee Indians. The Munsees, considered a branch of the Lenape people (also known as the Delaware), were Algonquian speakers who called the lake Quampium.

Some of the farms at the head of the lake were purchased by the Morris Canal and Banking Company in 1837, and portions of these properties were inundated after a dam was built that same year. It greatly increased the size of the lake to its current condition. The enlarged lake attracted tourists, and a grand hotel operated by Theron Felter was operating within the area of the village by at least 1851. The development of the village dates to 1856, when most of the available land was purchased by Solomon Caldwell. He divided the land for sale as “hotels, villa sites and town lots.” Subsequent plot plans suggested renaming the community the “town of Avington” in 1884, and “Montelac Park” in 1890, but it remained Greenwood Lake, becoming incorporated as a village in 1924. In the ensuing years many prominent people, such as baseball star Babe Ruth and actress Greta Garbo, regularly visited the resort. Author and composer Satella Waterstone was born in Greenwood Lake in 1875.

In July 2011, director Rob Reiner's movie, The Magic of Belle Isle starred Morgan Freeman, Virginia Madsen and Kenan Thompson. The movie was shot entirely in Greenwood Lake.

== Geography ==
Greenwood Lake is located at 41°13′21″N 74°17′23″W.

According to the United States Census Bureau, the village has a total area of 2.5 square miles (6.5 km^{2}), of which 2.0 square miles (5.2 km^{2}) is land and 0.4 square miles (1.0 km^{2}) (17.07%) is water.

The village is at the northern end of a lake called Greenwood Lake, which straddles the New York-New Jersey border. The lake is seven miles long.

The northern junction of NY-210 (Jersey Avenue/Windemere Avenue) is at NY-17A in the village.

== Demographics ==
Historical population
Census	Pop.	Note	%±
1930	332		—
1940	483		45.5%
1950	819		69.6%
1960	1,236		50.9%
1970	2,262		83.0%
1980	2,809		24.2%
1990	3,208		14.2%
2000	3,411		6.3%
2010	3,154		−7.5%
2020	2,994		−5.1%
U.S. Decennial Census

=== 2020 census ===
As of the 2020 census, Greenwood Lake had a population of 2,994. The median age was 46.6 years. 16.7% of residents were under the age of 18 and 17.3% of residents were 65 years of age or older. For every 100 females there were 100.4 males, and for every 100 females age 18 and over there were 98.0 males age 18 and over.

100.0% of residents lived in urban areas, while 0.0% lived in rural areas.

There were 1,286 households in Greenwood Lake, of which 24.1% had children under the age of 18 living in them. Of all households, 43.7% were married-couple households, 22.7% were households with a male householder and no spouse or partner present, and 25.8% were households with a female householder and no spouse or partner present. About 31.3% of all households were made up of individuals and 11.2% had someone living alone who was 65 years of age or older.

There were 1,520 housing units, of which 15.4% were vacant. The homeowner vacancy rate was 1.9% and the rental vacancy rate was 9.5%.

Racial composition as of the 2020 census
Race	Number	Percent
White	2,452	81.9%
Black or African American	50	1.7%
American Indian and Alaska Native	11	0.4%
Asian	41	1.4%
Native Hawaiian and Other Pacific Islander	4	0.1%
Some other race	130	4.3%
Two or more races	306	10.2%
Hispanic or Latino (of any race)	413	13.8%

=== 2000 census ===
As of the census of 2000, there were 3,411 people and 1,332 households in the village. The population density was 1,668.0 inhabitants per square mile (644.0/km^{2}). There were 1,534 housing units at an average density of 750.1 per square mile (289.6/km^{2}). The racial makeup of the village was 95.57% white, 0.76% African American, 0.26% Native American, 0.85% Asian, 0.03% Pacific Islander, 0.82% from other races, and 1.70% from two or more races. Hispanic or Latino of any race were 5.04% of the population.

There were 1,332 households, out of which 34.4% had children under the age of 18 living with them, 50.7% were married couples living together, 11.1% had a female householder with no husband present, and 34.1% were non-families. 26.7% of all households were made up of individuals, and 7.6% had someone living alone who was 65 years of age or older. The average household size was 2 and the average family size was 3.

In the village, the population was spread out, with 26.6% under the age of 18, 6.0% from 18 to 24, 34.2% from 25 to 44, 22.8% from 45 to 64, and 10.4% who were 65 years of age or older. The median age was 37 years. For every 100 females, there were 101.7 males. For every 100 females age 18 and over, there were 97.1 males.

=== Income and poverty ===
The median income for a household in the village was $80,805, and the median income for a family was $110,665. Males had a median income of $46,655 versus $37,328 for females. The per capita income for the village was $23,454. About 4.0% of families and 7.0% of the population were below the poverty line, including 6.3% of those under age 18 and 7.5% of those age 65 or over.

Greenwood Lake has an elementary and a middle school, which is located in Monroe, NY.

== Education ==
Most of the village is in the Greenwood Lake Union Free School District. A slice of the village is in the Tuxedo Union Free School District.

== Sources ==
- "History of Greenwood Lake," Steve Gross
- United States Census, Greenwood Lake village, New York profile
