= Warwick, New York =

Town in the State of New York

- Town
- Town of Warwick
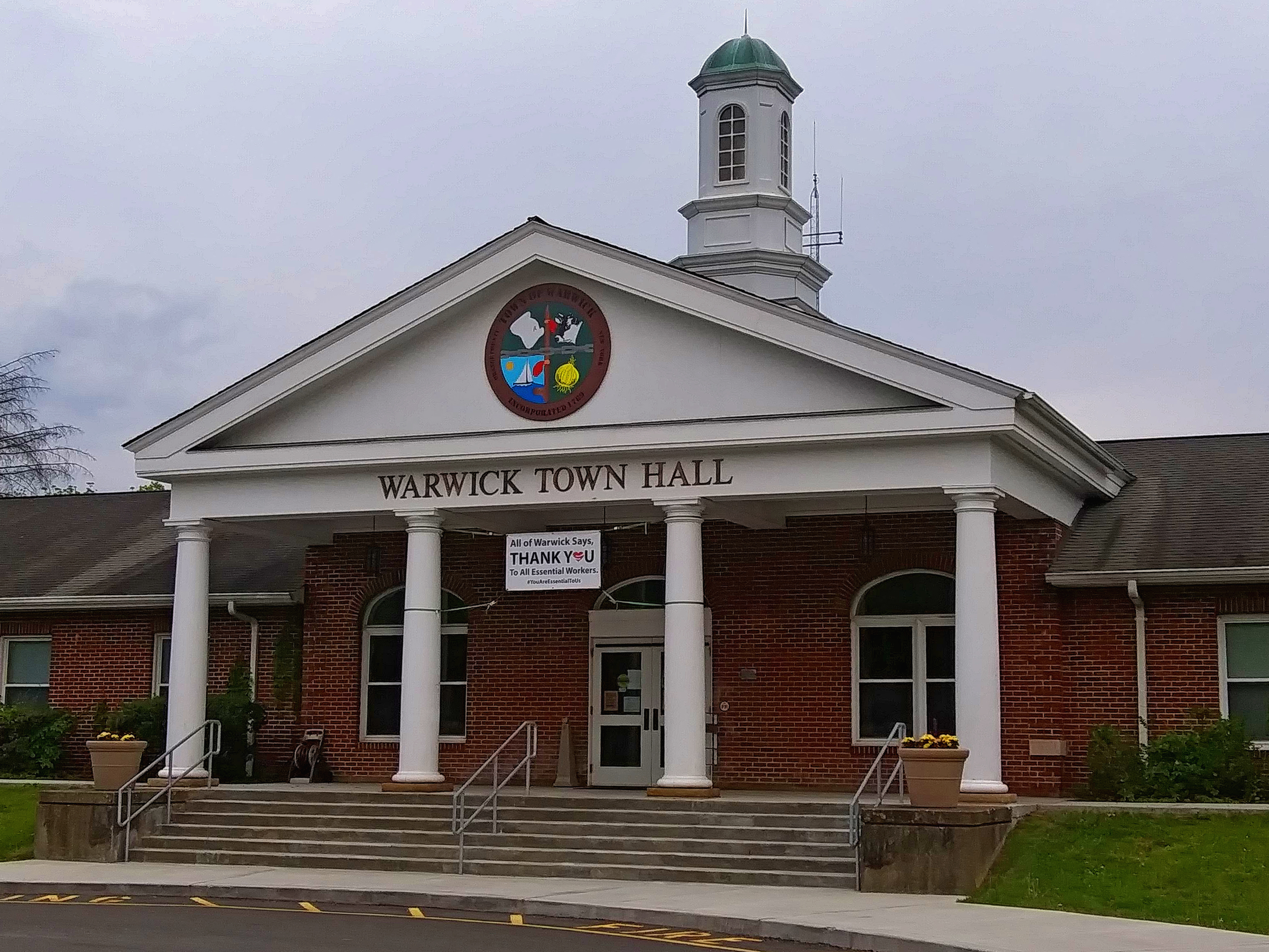
- Warwick Town Hall

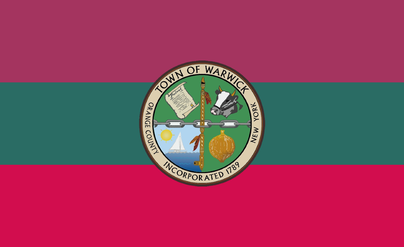
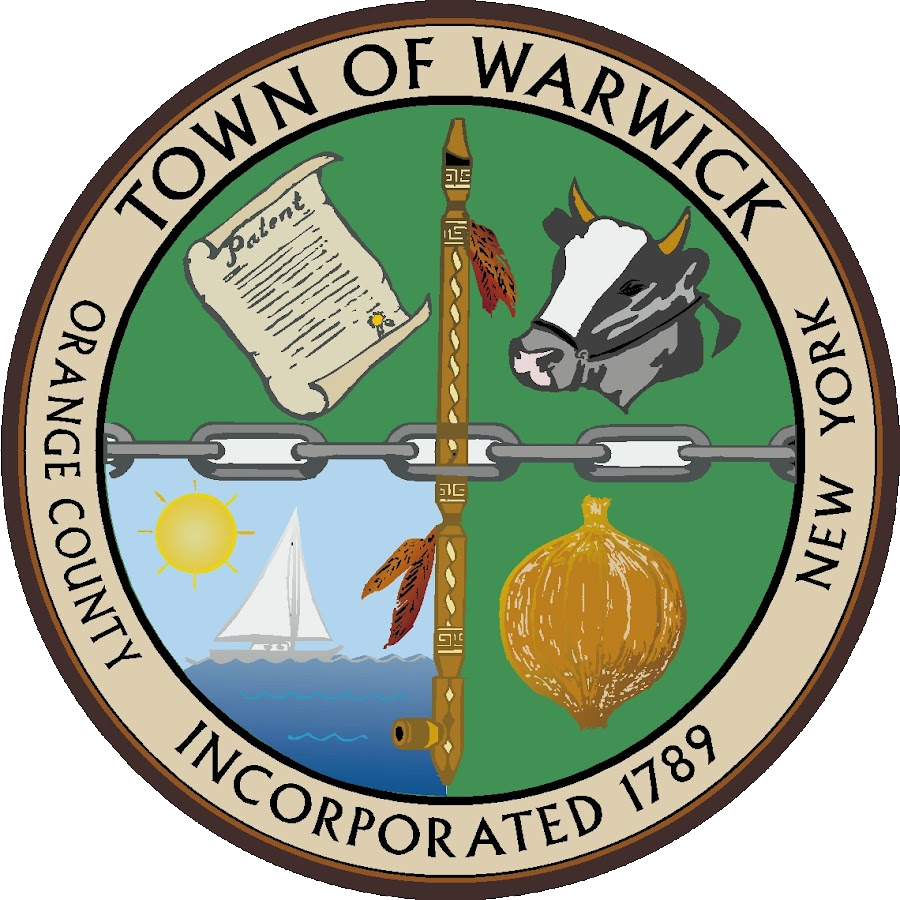
- Flag Seal

- Location in Orange County and New York

- Location in New York Warwick, New York (the United States)
- Coordinates: 41°15′40″N 74°21′19″W
- Country: United States
- State: New York
- County: Orange
- Incorporated: 1789

Government
  - Town Supervisor: Jesse Dwyer

Area
  - Total: 104.87 sq mi (271.61 km^{2})
  - Land: 101.29 sq mi (262.33 km^{2})
  - Water: 3.58 sq mi (9.28 km^{2})
- Elevation: 538 ft (164 m)

Population (2020)
  - Total: 32,027
  - Density: 316.20/sq mi (122.09/km^{2})
- Time zone: UTC−5 (EST)
  - Summer (DST): UTC−4 (EDT)
- ZIP Code: 10990
- Area code: 845
- FIPS code: 36-78366
- GNIS feature ID: 0979600
- Website: www.townofwarwickny.gov

Warwick is a town in the southwestern part of Orange County, New York, United States. Its population was 32,027 at the 2020 census. The town contains three villages (Florida, Greenwood Lake, and Warwick) and eight hamlets (Amity, Bellvale, Edenville, Little York, Wisner, New Milford, Pine Island, and Sterling Forest).

== History ==
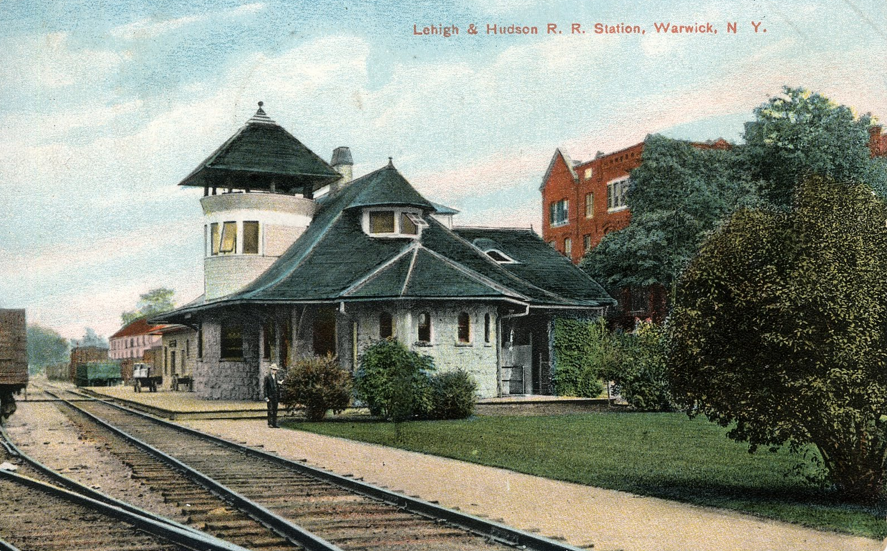
Warwick station, c. 1910

In the early 1700s, one of the original patent holders, Benjamin Aske, named his land "Warwick", presumably after an area of England near his original ancestral home. He began to sell it off to settlers in 1719. His first parcel of land, 100 acres, was sold to Lawrence Decker. Other familiar family names of the Valley appeared in subsequent years. The European population of the valley grew rapidly from 1730 to 1765, and the previously existing populations of indigenous native people declined as forests and land were cleared for pasture and were re-organized. By the start of the American Revolution, almost all of the native population had disappeared in various ways. The region has been referred to as Warwick since the early eighteenth century, but a governmental form for a town named Warwick was officially created in 1788.

During the American War for Independence, Warwick was the site of a Continental Army encampment. The Hudson River Chain was forged at Sterling Iron Works in Warwick, preventing the British Navy from sailing up the Hudson River. In 1783, George Washington traveled through Warwick, stopping at Baird's Tavern and spending the night in the home of John Hathorn.

Perspective map of Warwick from 1887 with list of landmarks by L.R. Burleigh

Warwick is situated along a freight rail line, which, as it did with many other towns in Orange County (such as Goshen, Middletown, and Newburgh), contributed to the growth of the area. The nineteenth-century writer and naturalist Henry William Herbert, writing as Frank Forrester, popularized the area with his 1845 book, "The Warwick Woodlands".

Between 1977 and 2011, Warwick was home to Mid-Orange Correctional Facility. The prison was closed in 2011 and transferred to the town in 2014. Part of the prison grounds became Wickham Woodlands Park, a large public park centred on Wickham Lake. The rest of the prison, including the buildings, became part of the Warwick Valley Office & Technology Corporate Park. Businesses on the site include the Hudson Sports Complex, Drowned Lands Brewery, as well as cannabis industry companies Green Thumb Industries, UrbanXtracts, Phyto-Farma labs, and Citiva Medical. Other companies with a presence in the town include Trans Tech.

== Geography ==
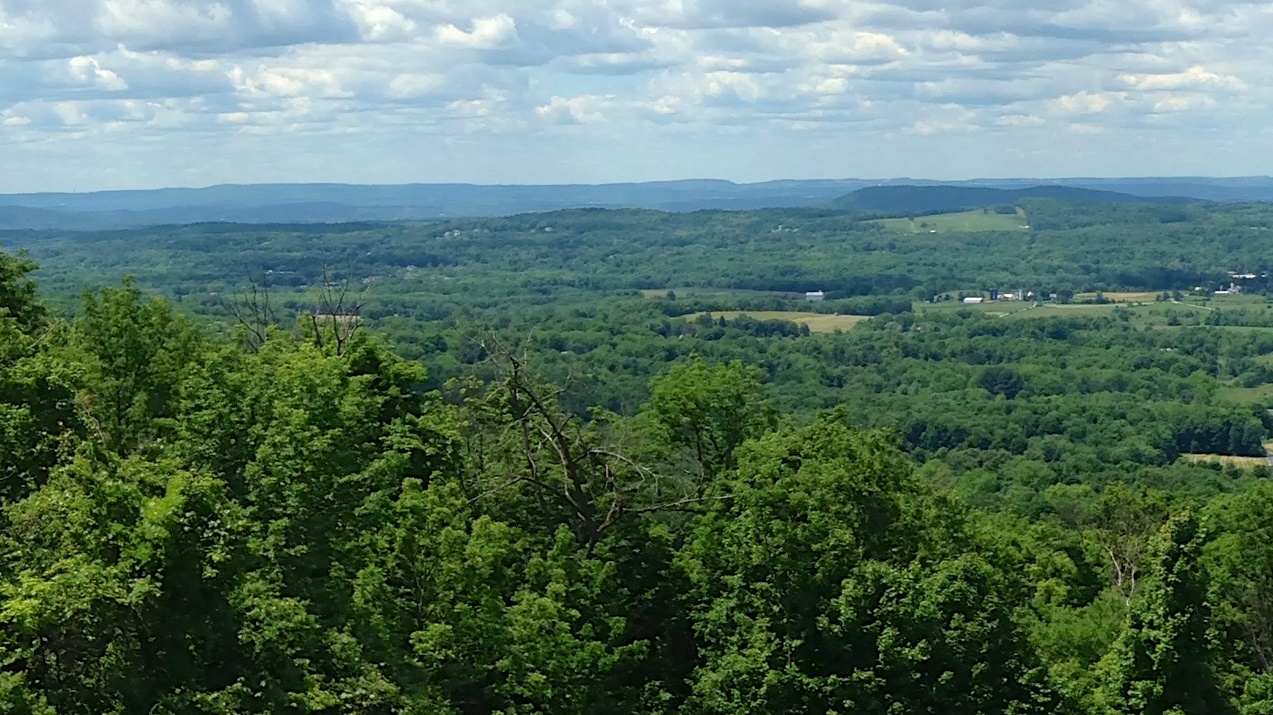
View of the Warwick Valley from Mt. Peter

The town of Warwick comprises much of the southern tip of Orange County. It borders the townships of Vernon and West Milford to the south, both in the state of New Jersey. To its north, Warwick is bordered by Chester via Sugar Loaf, Orange County's oldest hamlet, antedating both Warwick and Chester, and which was part of Warwick until the mid-nineteenth century. To its east, Warwick is bordered by the town of Tuxedo, home of the New York Renaissance Faire, and the hamlet of Tuxedo Park.

According to the United States Census Bureau, the town is the second largest township in New York State and has a total area of 104.9 square miles (271.6 km^{2}), of which 101.7 square miles (263.3 km^{2}) is land and 3.2 square miles (8.3 km^{2}) (3.04%) is water. Greenwood Lake is Orange County's largest lake, and it is bisected by the border between New Jersey (to the south) and New York (on its north). Glenmere Lake, an extremely critical endangered species habitat, is bisected by Warwick and Chester.

Warwick is served by Warwick Municipal Airport and two regional state highways, New York State Route 17A (NY 17A) and NY 94. The Appalachian Trail passes through Warwick, which has been designated an Appalachian Trail Community.

Warwick is part of the Black Dirt Region and has good agricultural soil.

=== Climate ===
Climate data for Warwick, NY
Month	Jan	Feb	Mar	Apr	May	Jun	Jul	Aug	Sep	Oct	Nov	Dec	Year
Mean daily maximum °F (°C)	35 (2)	38 (3)	47 (8)	61 (16)	70 (21)	78 (26)	83 (28)	81 (27)	75 (24)	63 (17)	51 (11)	40 (4)	60 (16)
Mean daily minimum °F (°C)	17 (−8)	18 (−8)	26 (−3)	37 (3)	47 (8)	55 (13)	60 (16)	59 (15)	51 (11)	40 (4)	31 (−1)	23 (−5)	39 (4)
Average precipitation inches (mm)	3.1 (79)	2.6 (66)	3.6 (91)	4.0 (100)	4.0 (100)	4.4 (110)	3.8 (97)	4.3 (110)	4.2 (110)	3.7 (94)	3.6 (91)	3.4 (86)	44.7 (1,134)
Average snowfall inches (cm)	12.2 (31)	9.4 (24)	6.7 (17)	1.2 (3.0)	0.0 (0.0)	0.0 (0.0)	0.0 (0.0)	0.0 (0.0)	0.0 (0.0)	0.0 (0.0)	1.6 (4.1)	7.8 (20)	38.9 (99.1)
Average precipitation days (≥ 0.01 in)	7	6	8	8	9	9	7	8	7	6	7	7	89
Mean daily daylight hours	9.5	10.5	12.0	13.0	14.5	15.0	15.0	14.0	12.5	11.0	10.0	9.5	12.2
Source: NOAA/Google

== Demographics ==
Historical population
Census	Pop.	Note	%±
1820	4,506		—
1830	5,013		11.3%
1840	5,113		2.0%
1850	4,902		−4.1%
1860	4,628		−5.6%
1870	5,736		23.9%
1880	5,699		−0.6%
1890	6,000		5.3%
1900	6,403		6.7%
1910	7,141		11.5%
1920	7,462		4.5%
1930	8,017		7.4%
1940	9,369		16.9%
1950	9,828		4.9%
1960	12,551		27.7%
1970	16,956		35.1%
1980	20,976		23.7%
1990	27,193		29.6%
2000	30,764		13.1%
2010	32,065		4.2%
2020	32,027		−0.1%
U.S. Decennial Census

As of the census of 2000, there were 30,764 people, 10,868 households, and 7,955 families residing in the town. The population density was 302.6 inhabitants per square mile (116.8/km^{2}). There were 11,818 housing units at an average density of 116.2 per square mile (44.9/km^{2}). The racial makeup of the town was 91.06% White, 4.51% Black or African American, 0.31% Native American, 0.85% Asian, 0.05% Pacific Islander, 1.60% from other races, and 1.61% from two or more races. Hispanic or Latino of any race were 6.47% of the population.

There were 10,868 households, of which 38.5% had children under the age of 18 living with them, 61.7% were married couples living together, 8.6% had a female householder with no husband present, and 26.8% were non-families. 22.0% of all households were made up of individuals, and 9.1% had someone living alone who was 65 years of age or older. The average household size was 2.74 and the average family size was 3.25.

In the town, the population was spread out, with 27.2% under the age of 18, 5.6% from 18 to 24, 31.3% from 25 to 44, 24.6% from 45 to 64, and 11.3% who were 65 years of age or older. The median age was 38 years. For every 100 females, there were 100.7 males. For every 100 females age 18 and over, there were 98.2 males.

== Education ==
Most of the town is in the Warwick Valley Central School District.

The Florida Union Free School District includes some other parts of the town. The district Florida Union Free School District serves the residents of Florida, NY, with Golden Hill Elementary School and S. S. Seward Institute.

The Greenwood Lake Union Free School District includes another part of the town. It Home - Greenwood Lake Union Free School District serves the residents of Greenwood Lake, with the GWL Elementary School and GWL Middle School; students have a choice of Chester Academy or Warwick Valley High School for their high school education.

Another part is in the Tuxedo Union Free School District.

== Festivals ==
Applefest is an annual outdoor festival attracting as many as 35,000 people each year in October.

The Hudson Valley Jazz Festival, originally named the Warwick Valley Jazz Festival, takes place during the summer.

The annual George Washington Day 5K is a tradition that celebrates when the Founding Father, Gen. George Washington, came to Warwick and enjoyed a grog with his men in Baird's Tavern. This popular tradition takes place in July, and is carried on by the Historical Society of the Town of Warwick, also known as the Warwick Historical Society, a nonprofit organization dedicated to Warwick since its inception in 1906.

== Transportation ==
Warwick is served by the 196 and 197 buses to Manhattan (operated by New Jersey Transit). It is also served by the Warwick inter-municipal bus.

== Government and infrastructure ==
Formerly the Mid-Orange Correctional Facility was in the town.

== Communities and locations in the town of Warwick ==
- Warwick – village located by the junction of NY 94 and NY 17A
- Florida – village located on NY 17A
- Greenwood Lake – village located on NY 17A at the north end of Greenwood Lake
- Amity – hamlet located between Edenville and Pine Island near the New Jersey state line - It is served by the Amity Station of the Pine Island Fire Department and is the site of the Amity Presbyterian Church, which was first opened in 1796.
- Bellvale – hamlet on NY 17A between Warwick village and Greenwood Lake
- Black Walnut Hill – hamlet north of Hoopstick on Pulaski Highway
- Cascade Lake – a small lake in the hills on the southern part of town
- Center – a historic hamlet identified solely by the post office that was located at the Warwick Woodlands Hotel from 1909 to 1916 on the western shore of Greenwood Lake north of Furnace Brook. An earlier post office by the name of Warwick Woodlands, New York, operated at the same location from 1882 to 1891.
- Durland – hamlet northeast of Warwick village and west of Wickham Lake
- Edenville – hamlet in the western part of Warwick, on Pine Island Turnpike, just off County Route 1 (CR 1)
- Greenwood Forest Farms – an early area retreat for African-American families
- Hoopstick – hamlet north of Pine Island in the "black dirt" on Pulaski Highway, historically the home of nineteenth century barrel hoop makers
- Lake – hamlet along King's Highway near the town line at Chester; Had a depot, freight house, creamery, post office, general store and long passing siding on the Lehigh and Hudson River Railway
- Lakeville – hamlet located at the southern end of Sterling Lake
- Liberty Corners – hamlet on CR 88, near the New Jersey state line in the southwestern part of the town
- Little York – hamlet east of Pine Island
- New Milford – hamlet near the New Jersey state line on NY 94
- Newport – hamlet south of Pine Island
- Pine Island – hamlet at the junction of CR 1 (Pine Island Turnpike), CR 6 (Pulaski Highway), and CR 26 (Glenwood Road) near the northwest town line - It is the commercial center of the "black dirt" region.
- Quaker Creek – hamlet south of Snufftown on Pulaski Highway, directly on the border with the town of Goshen
- Snufftown – hamlet north of Pine Island near the town line; historically considered the "Snufftown section of the village of Florida", it is the last settlement in the Florida union-free school district, named for the habit of the early twentieth century farmers who relaxed on the front porch of one of the earliest homesteads, drinking beer, and chewing snuff.
- Sterling Forest – a hamlet located at the New Jersey state line on the eastern shore of Greenwood Lake, and served by the Sterling Forest, New York, post office. It was the site of the first American rocket airplane flight that carried mail from New York to New Jersey on February 23, 1936. Babe Ruth often rented a cabin there for the summer season during his retirement. The Jehovah's Witnesses' world headquarters building is located in Sterling Forest.
- Wisner – hamlet northeast of Warwick village originally known as "Stone Bridge"; Had a depot, freight house, creamery, and siding on the Lehigh and Hudson River Railway and a post office, Grange general store and warehouse, the latter of which still stands.
- Glenmere Lake – a reservoir that hosts New York's last population of the endangered northern cricket frog
- Greenwood Lake – a lake on the border of New York and New Jersey
- Mount Adam – a granite and shale mount directly on the border of the "black dirt", near the northern town line and directly southwest of Mount Eve
- Mount Eve – a granite and shale mount, one-quarter mile south of Snufftown and northeast of Mount Adam
- Pochuck Neck – a location near the western town line between Liberty Corners and Pine Island
- Sterling Lake – a lake in the eastern part of the town
- Wallkill River National Wildlife Refuge – northernmost part only
- Wickham Lake – a small lake near the northern town line

== Notable people ==
- Mike Jackson - Jazz Guitarist
- Damon Amendolara - radio host on CBS Sports Radio
- Steve Brinster – professional disc golfer and winner of the 2013 United States Disc Golf Championship
- Carleton Carpenter, actor
- E. Jean Carroll – advice columnist with Elle magazine
- James Cromwell – actor and long-term activist for community issues concerning environment
- Jasper Francis Cropsey – Hudson River School artist
- Gus Dapperton - indie pop musician
- Susan J. Elliott – author and media commentator, owns a residence in Pine Island
- James Emery - jazz guitarist and founding member of the String Trio of New York
- Frederick Franck - painter, sculptor, and author
- John Hathorn – Commander in the American Revolutionary War and New York politician
- Derek Jeter – owns a residence on the western shore of Greenwood Lake, originally known as Tiedemann Castle, built in 1915.
- Michael N. Kane – lawyer, judge, and politician
- Richard Kiley – actor
- Bill Pennington – sports reporter for The New York Times and author of multiple books
- Emilio Sanchez – painter with works in The Metropolitan Museum of Art and other collections
- William H. Seward – Secretary of State to Abraham Lincoln, born and raised in the village of Florida
- Jimmy Sturr – eighteen-time Grammy Award winner, grew up and resides in the village of Florida
- Jonathan Talbot – internationally known painter, collage artist, and author
- Robert Whitman (1935–2024), visual and performance artist best known for his pieces of the early 1960s combining visual and sound images, actors, film, slides, and evocative props
- Gretchen Wyler – American actress and dancer
- Caden Dana - Major League Baseball pitcher

== See also ==
- "Growing Up Greenpoint - A Kid's Life in 1970s Brooklyn". The town at the ending of the book is Warwick, NY, where the author, Tommy Carbone went to high school.
- Michael Jackson – "Earth Song" music video
- Warwick Advertiser
