= Pine Island, New York =

Hamlet in the town of Warwick, New York, US

- Hamlet
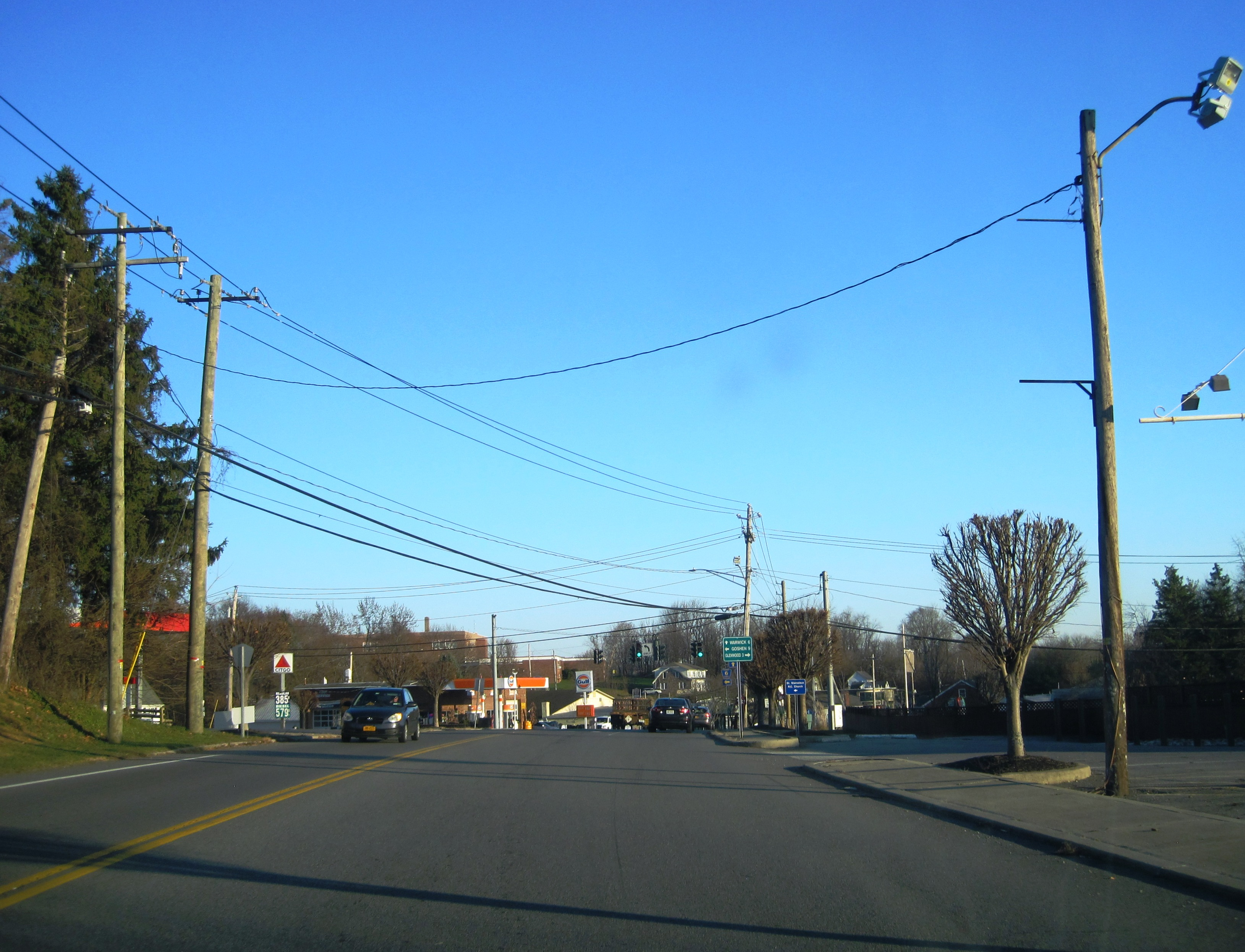
- Eastbound Pine Island Turnpike approaching Pulaski Highway

- Location within New York
- Coordinates: 41.298°N 74.460°W
- Country: United States
- State: New York
- County: Orange
- Time zone: UTC-5 (EST)
  - Summer (DST): UTC-4 (EDT)
- ZIP Code: 10969
- Area code: 845

Pine Island is a hamlet in the town of Warwick in Orange County, New York, United States. It is the largest community in the Black Dirt Region, which is famous for its "black dirt onions." It gets its name from its slight elevation over the surrounding land. In the days before the nearby Wallkill River was rerouted to control flooding, it would often be an actual island for a period in the spring.

== History ==
Pine Island is known for its black dirt. This rich soil is the result of constant flooding during the retreat of glaciers during the last ice age, about 12,000 years ago. The "muck," as it was called, plastered shallow lakes that today make up the fields, or "flats." Much the same as a peat bog, these areas are known for their prolific fossil production, particularly those of ancient mastodons. Into the 1800s the swamps still lingered, surrounding what is greater Pine Island. It was then that these lakes were first drained to be utilized for their superior growing capabilities. The Wallkill River winds through this region and drops a mere 11 feet. When flooded, small islands emerged, Pine Island being the principal one.

When locals first tried to alter the route of the river, obstacles lay in river bed obstructions and man-made dams erected for the purpose of providing water power to local mills. Farmers wanting to eliminate the constant threat of flood could not afford to pay the local mill owner to lower his dam, so they dug a series of ditches and canals to drain the "Drowned Lands."

Between 1829 and the turn of the twentieth century, a series of votes, rulings, arrests, injunctions, dam destructions and repairs ensued during what became known as the Muskrat (dam destroyers) and Beaver (dam builders) War.

In the early 1900s, German, Polish and Dutch immigrants did the work of draining the swamp bogs with a network of ditches. These efforts exposed "a sulfur and nitrogen-rich black soil that in some places is 30 feet deep." This area continues to have a strong Polish ethnic heritage, particularly in the Pine Island farming community.

Pine Island was the southernmost terminus of the Erie Railroad's Goshen and Deckertown extension in 1867 and was the chief conveyor of agricultural products from the hamlet. The depot was located where the line met Pine Island Turnpike and still survives as a pre-school. Just north of the hamlet, there was a junction with the Lehigh & New England Railroad (L&NE) who had trackage rights over the Erie from Pine Island Jct. to Goshen. After the abandonment of the L&NE in 1961 and declining traffic levels, the Pine Island Branch was deemed unnecessary and ripped up.

Pine Island is famous for its onion production and hosts an annual Onion Harvest Festival.

== Education ==
Pine Island is part of the Warwick Valley Central School District. Faced with declining town-wide school enrollment and a budget gap, the Warwick school board voted to close Pine Island Elementary, the smallest of the four district elementary schools, at the end of the 2010–2011 school year. Pine Island students now attend Sandfordville Elementary School. Books from the closed school library were donated in 2013 to the Rhame Avenue Elementary School in East Rockaway, New York to replace those damaged by Hurricane Sandy. The school was reopened in 2020 for all Warwick Valley School District Kindergarten children for the 2020–2021 school year. It will also be open for the 2021–2022 school year.

== Landmarks ==
- St. Stanislaus Roman Catholic Church - Founded in 1912, the parish marked its centennial on June 23, 2012, with a mass celebrated by Cardinal Timothy Dolan.
- St. Peter Lutheran Church - Founded in 1901 by Volga German immigrants, the church was rebuilt in 1918 following a fire on Christmas Eve, 1917.
- Quaker Creek Store - This store and restaurant specializing in charcuterie and Polish cuisine was featured in a 2010 episode of the Travel Channel show Anthony Bourdain: No Reservations.
- Black Dirt Distillery
- Polish Legion of American Veterans Memorial Post 16
- Pine Island Park-Home of the only playground onion in the county
- Scenic Farms Golf Course - a 9-hole golf course and driving range

== Notable people ==
- Vincent Kosuga - farmer and entrepreneur whose efforts to corner the onion futures market led to the 1958 Onion Futures Act
- Cheryl Rogowski - farmer and recipient of a 2004 MacArthur Fellowship ("Genius Grant") for her work on community-supported agriculture

== See also ==
- Warwick, New York
- Orange County, New York
- Black Dirt Region
- Wallkill River
