= Fairview Peak Lookout (Colorado) =

Historic lookout in Colorado, United States

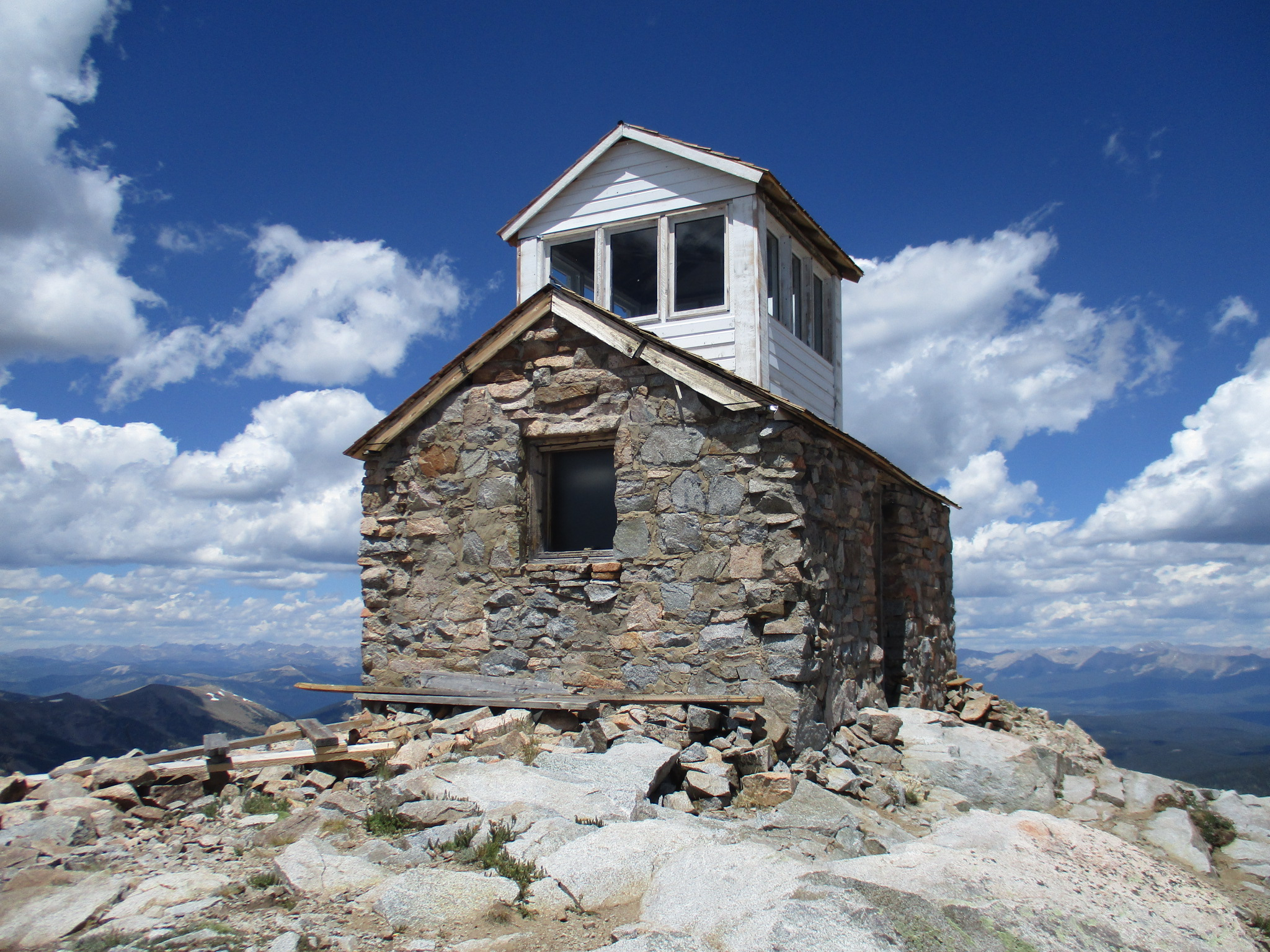
- Fairview Peak Lookout, 2024

- Location of Fairview Peak Lookout in Colorado
- 38°41′00″N 106°32′13″W
- Type: fire lookout
- Location: Gunnison County, Colorado, US
- Nearest city: Pitkin

History
- Built: 1912

Site notes
- Elevation: 13,214 feet (4,028 m)
- Restored: 2008 to 2015
- Current use: abandoned
- Owner: United States Forest Service
Gunnison County Historic Landmark

Fairview Peak Lookout is a fire lookout tower located at the summit of Fairview Peak in Gunnison County, Colorado. The lookout lies within the Fossil Ridge Recreation Management Area of the Gunnison National Forest. At an elevation of 13,214 feet (4,028 m), the one-room stone structure with a second-story wooden cupola is the highest elevation fire lookout constructed in the United States.

== History ==
The Fairview Peak Lookout was constructed about 1912. Granitic stones obtained from the site were used to construct the 18-inch (46 cm)-thick walls of the first floor. A second-story wooden cupola was added, which gave observers a 360-degree view of the land below. A plane table and alidade were never used in the small cupola. Communication to the lookout was by a telegraph line that was laid 10 miles (16 km) to the nearby town of Pitkin. The lookout was staffed until at least 1916, the last year of known records. Cited reasons for ending fire lookout here has been the danger and damage imposed by repeated lightning strikes and the beginning of World War I.

In the 1960s, the Forest Service used the building as a radio repeater station. The cupola was removed and the stone first floor was reroofed. Grounding wires were installed, yet frequent lightning prevented continued service.

In 2008, the Forest Service began restoration of the historic lookout. The stone walls were stabilized and a new roof was installed. In 2015, with the assistance of HistoriCorps, the cupola was rebuilt.

== Visiting the Lookout ==
Accessing the lookout requires hiking at high elevation, typically during the summer and early fall when snow is free of the roads used to reach the trailheads. The easiest route to the summit starts at the Fairview Peak Trailhead located on the southern shoulder of the mountain. A 0.8-mile (1.3 km) trail leads to the lookout with 900 feet (274 m) of elevation gain. The Fairview Peak Trailhead is 7 miles (11 km) north of Pitkin at the end of Forest Road 770. High-clearance four-wheel-drive vehicles are recommended to reach the trailhead.

The Lookout can also be reached from Cumberland Pass. Old mining roads can be followed to hike along the ridge southwest to Green Mountain. From there, an off-trail ridge hike leads west to the summit. This class 2 route is 3.6 miles (5.8 km) and the elevation gain is 1,850 feet (564 m).
