= Fairview Peak =

Fairview Peak may refer to

- Fairview Peak (Gunnison County, Colorado), in the Sawatch Range 38°41′00″N 106°32′13″W
- Fairview Peak (Oregon), in Lane County, Oregon, U.S. (43°35′09″N 122°39′08″W)
- Fairview Peak (Churchill County, Nevada), in the Clan Alpine Mountains (39°13′30″N 118°09′09″W)
- Fairview Peak (Lincoln County, Nevada), in the Fairview Range (38°17′54″N 114°38′00″W)
