= Bearfort Mountain =

Mountain ridge in West Milford, New Jersey

- Bearfort Ridge
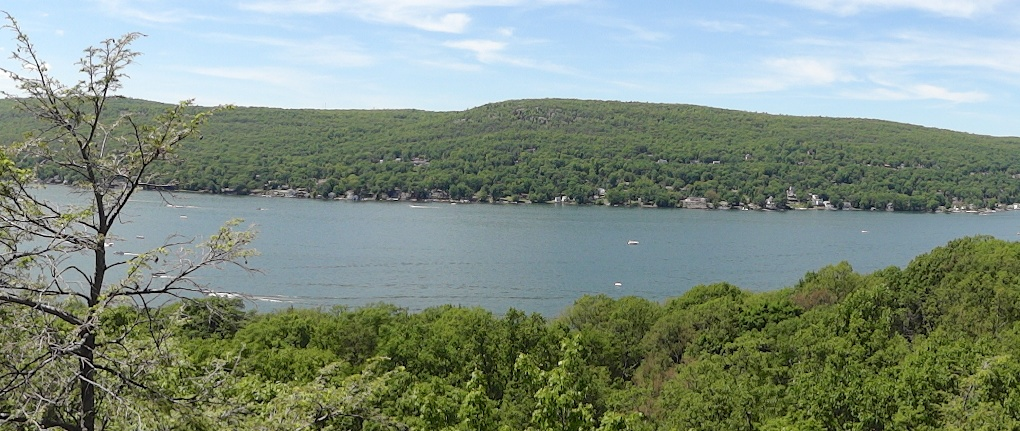
- Bearfort Mountain (left), Bellvale Mountain (right)

Highest point
- Peak: Bearfort Mountain
- Elevation: 1,460 feet (445 m)
- Coordinates: 41°08′22″N 74°23′29″W

Geography
- Location: Passaic County, New Jersey, U.S.

Geology
- Rock age: Devonian
- Rock type: Skunnemunk Conglomerate

Bearfort Mountain, historically known as Bear Ford Mountain, is a mountain ridge extending from Wawayanda State Park northward through Abram S. Hewitt State Forest in West Milford, Passaic County, New Jersey. It is a continuation of Bellvale Mountain in New York. The Appalachian Trail crosses along the ridge into New York. Puddingstone of the Skunnemunk Conglomerate is visible along the ridge.

At an elevation of 1,331 feet (406 m) the ridge is the site of a 68 feet (21 m) high fire lookout tower built by the New Jersey Forest Fire Service.

The mountain was depicted in an 1850 painting by Jasper Francis Cropsey, an American landscape artist of the Hudson River School.

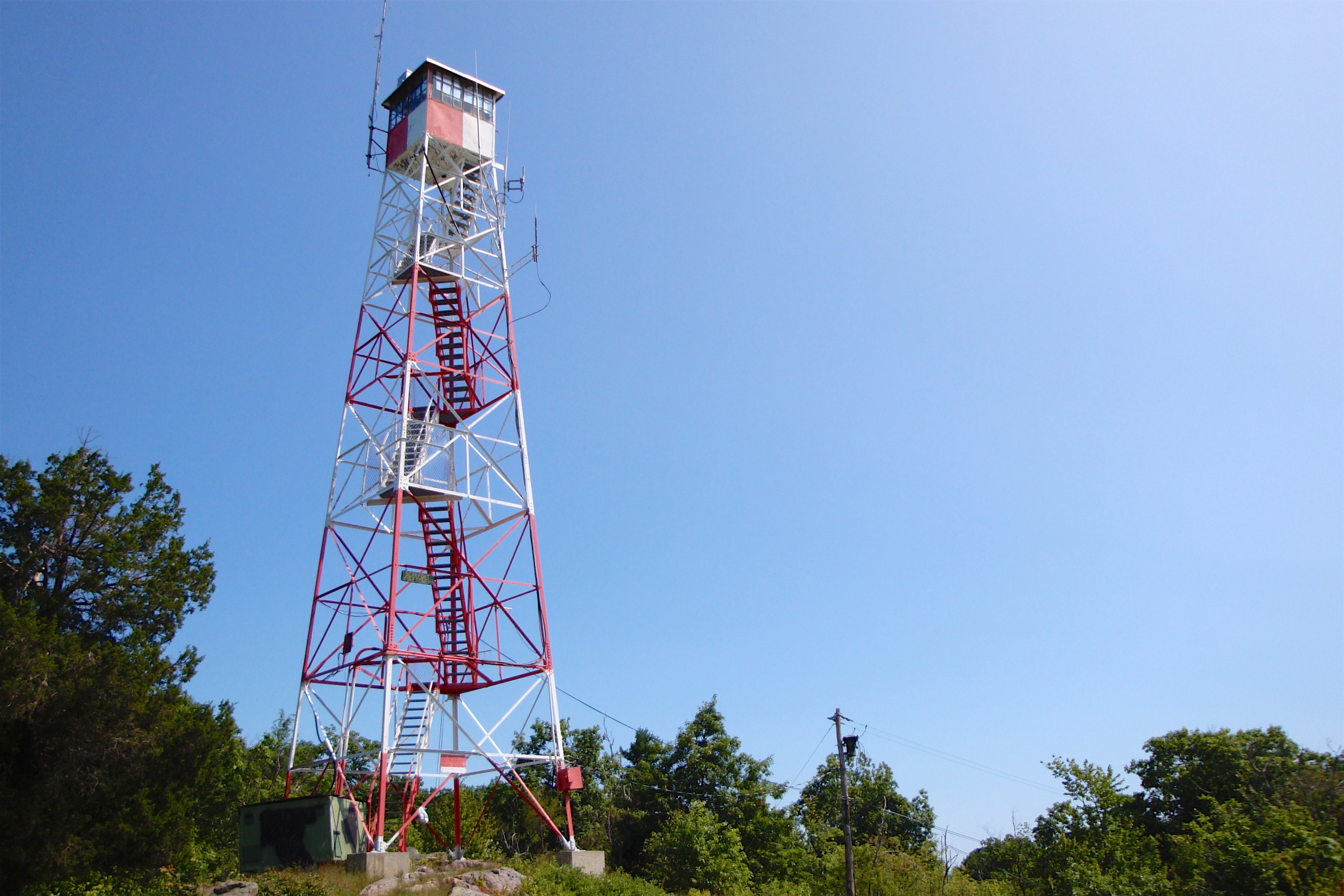
Bearfort Ridge Fire Tower

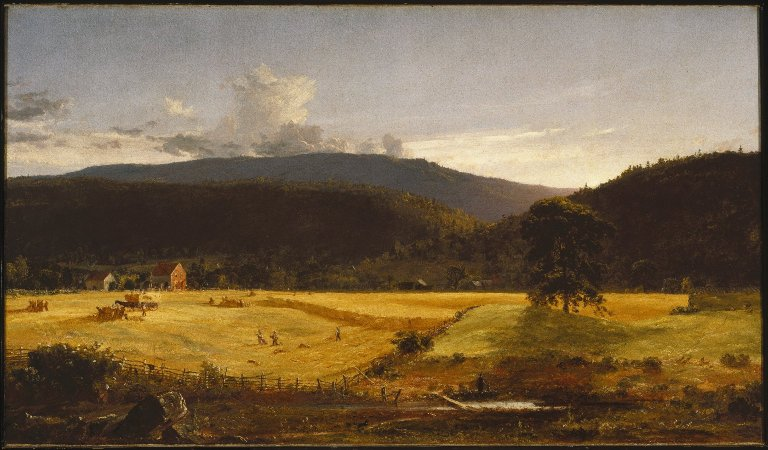
Bareford Mountains, West Milford, New Jersey by Jasper Francis Cropsey, 1850

== See also ==
- List of New Jersey Forest Fire Service fire towers
