= Mount Peter =

Mount Peter may refer to:

- Mount Peter (Antarctica), a mountain in Antarctica
- Mount Peter (New York), a mountain in the United States of America
- Mount Peter, Queensland, a locality in the Cairns Region, Queensland, Australia
