= Bellvale Mountain =

Mountain range in New York, US

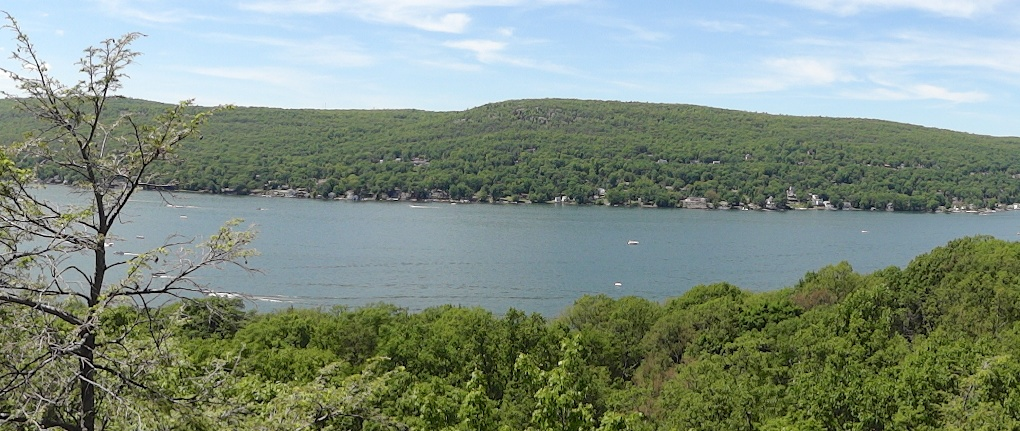
- Bearfort Mountain (left), Bellvale Mountain (right)

Highest point
- Peak: Bellvale Mountain
- Elevation: 1,336 ft (407 m)
- Coordinates: 41°12′31″N 74°19′56″W

Geography
- Country: United States
- State: New York

Geology
- Rock age: Devonian
- Rock type: Skunnemunk Conglomerate

Bellvale Mountain is a mountain range located near Bellvale in Orange County, New York. It is a continuation of Bearfort Mountain in New Jersey. The Appalachian Trail is located along the ridge of the mountain. Puddingstone of the Skunnemunk Conglomerate is visible along the ridge.
