= Bellvale, New York =

- Hamlet
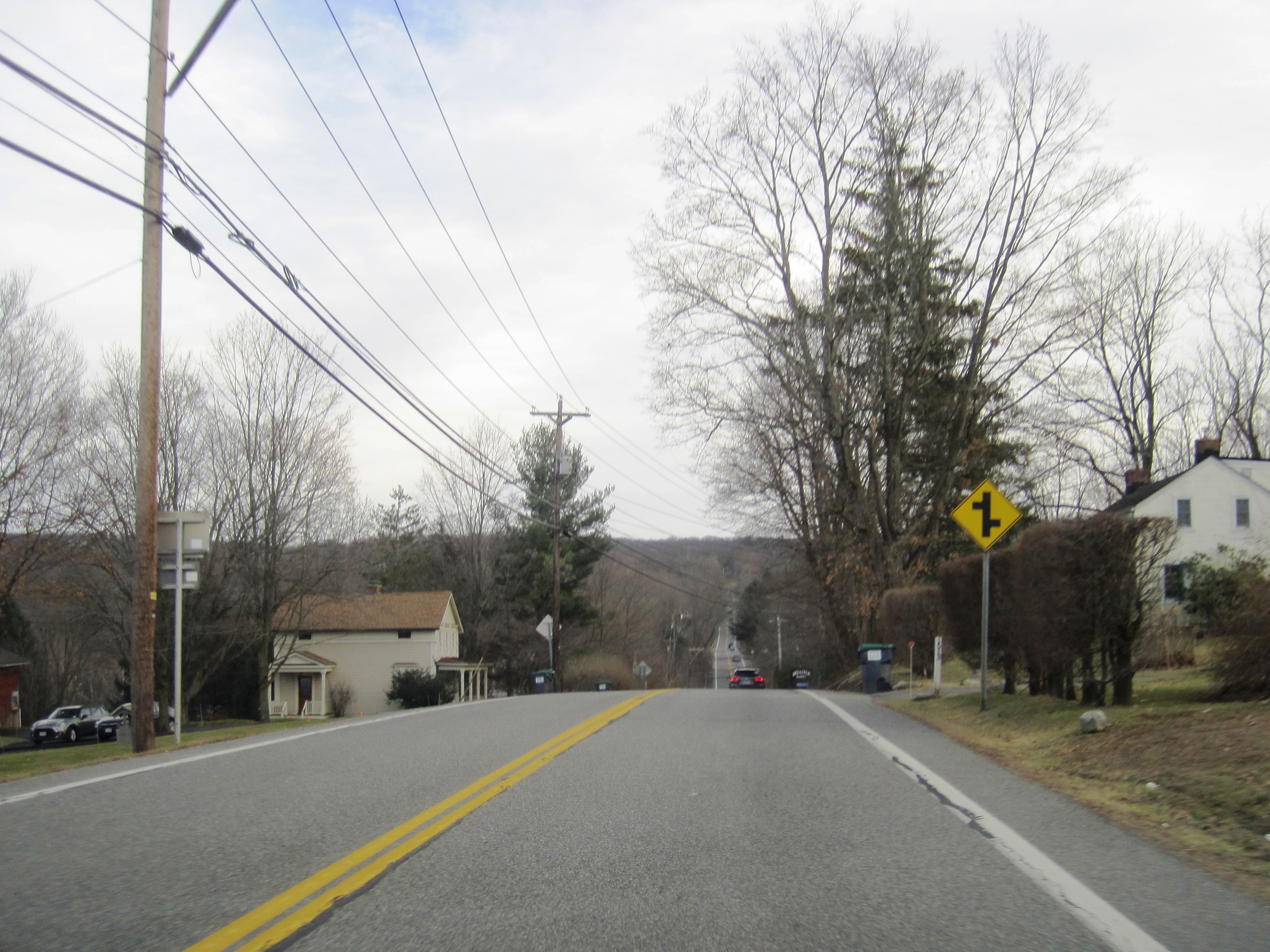
- Bellvale from NY 17A

- Location of Bellvale in New York
- Coordinates: 41°15′02″N 74°18′39″W
- Country: United States
- State: New York
- County: Orange
- Town: Warwick
- Elevation: 640 ft (200 m)
- Time zone: UTC-5 (Eastern (EST))
  - Summer (DST): UTC-4 (EDT)
- ZIP code: 10912
- Area code: 845
- GNIS feature ID: 942435
- Early name: Wawayanda

Bellvale is a wooded hamlet in the town of Warwick in Orange County, New York, United States. Situated in the morning shadow of Bellvale Mountain along New York State Route 17A, Bellvale was the site of an iron forge destroyed by British Army soldiers in 1750; many of its homes and other structures date from before American independence. While close to New York City, its location in the Warwick Valley has prevented suburban development.

== History ==
Leni Lenape of the "wolf" clan known as Munsees occupied the Warwick Valley before the first Dutch trappers appeared on the Hudson River. Munsees lived in long houses made of sapling staves and layers of collected bark; they raised crops using the Three Sisters form of companion planting and used the tall-growth forests and streams for hunting and fishing. The Munsees of the area lived in a long house by the creek they called Wawayanda.

Part of a land patent granted by Queen Anne in 1703, Bellvale was called Wawayanda (the name of the patent) in colonial times. Settlers were drawn to the area because of the abundant timber, game, and water power readily available from Long House Creek, allowing the operation of water wheel-driven mills. Tanneries, sawmills, gristmills, and forges have been served by the fast rushing creek since Lawrence Scrauley first built his trip hammer plating and slitting mill in 1745, the only such mill then operating in New York colony. Scrauley hoped Bellvale's remote location would allow him to escape notice of British authorities intent on shutting down the American colonies' nascent iron-working industry. By 1750, the Iron Act was passed in London requiring Governor George Clinton to report on the plating forge. The mill was later wrecked by the British, and its destruction became one of many incidents leading to the American Revolutionary War.

The Iron Act was repealed in 1758, and though Scrauley didn't rebuild his forge, others built a series of water-powered mills and forges along the creek, and by the 1775 the iron-working industries of Sterling Forest, Bellvale and Warwick were capable of creating an immense chain to block the Hudson River at West Point during the Revolution. Each link in the chain weighed 150 pounds; the entire length weighed 188 tons. During the war several gristmills were kept employed making flour and meal for local consumption and for the army's use. Sawmills turned the abundant local maples, oaks, and hemlocks into usable boards, and textile mills processed woolen cloth for uniforms and blankets. By the early 1800s Bellvale was a thriving village; the new "Continental road" from Warwick to Tuxedo allowed the community's goods to reach markets closer to the Hudson River. But when the new railroads came through the Warwick valley, Bellvale's best manufacturing days were over. The valley, now cleared of tall-growth trees, became fertile farmland. Wheat and corn were planted. Then as now, apple trees were planted, but then mostly for cider production.

== Geography ==
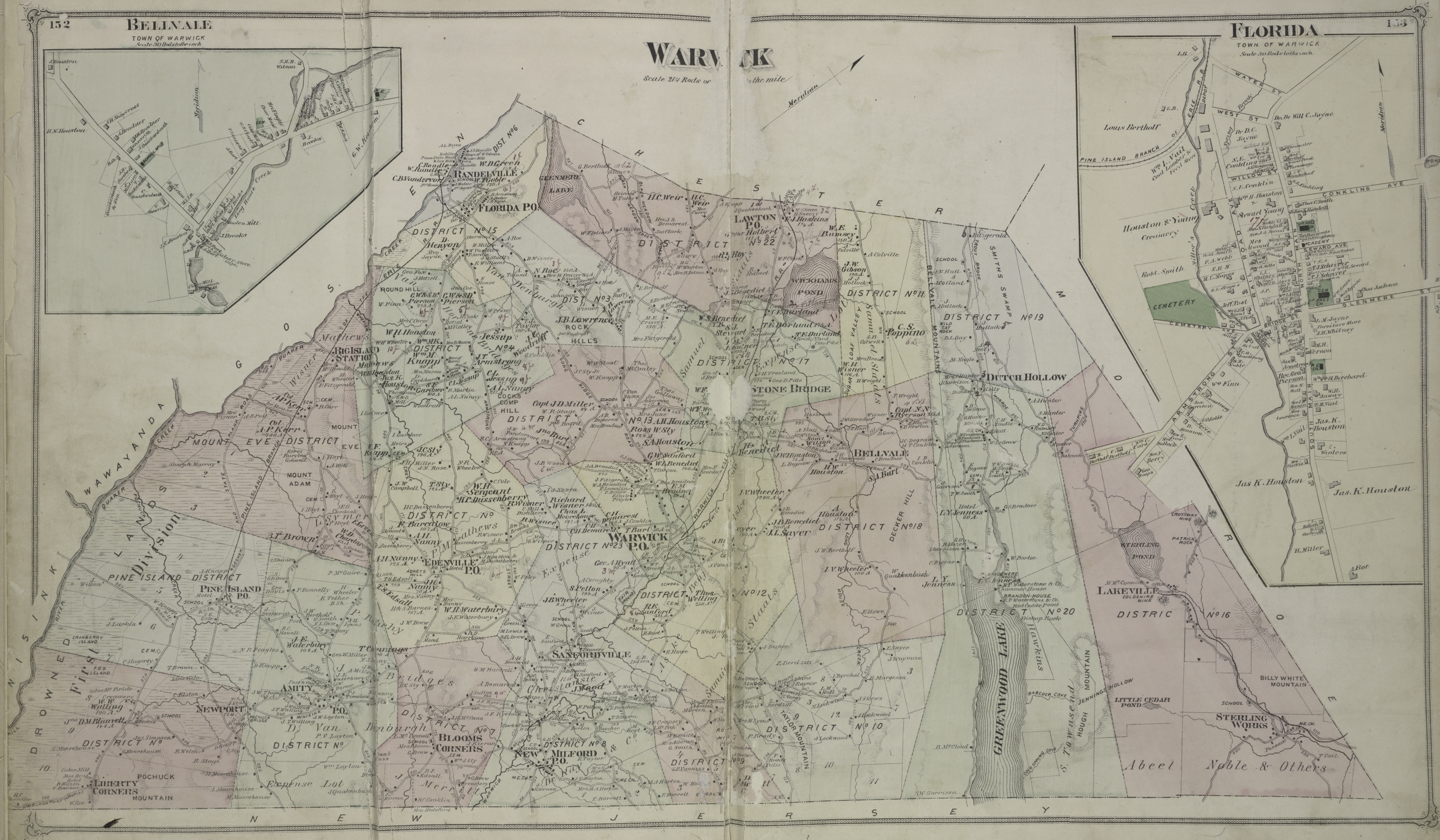
1875 map of Warwick, with Bellvale and Florida

Bellvale is bisected by New York State Route 17A, though one of its older streets, Pumpkin Hill Road, lies along the path of the historic Tuxedo to Warwick road, improved by Continental Army engineers in 1779. Wooden bridges were constructed across Long House creek for the Tuxedo road and on Iron Forge Road, both later replaced by stone arch bridges, now modern concrete structures. Cascade Road begins at NY17A and follows the creek's cascade south for much of its course upward toward its sources along the ridgetop lakes and marshes of the Bearfort Ridge; the Cascade Park community lies hidden in these mountains along this road.

Eastward of Bellvale Route 17A's roadway rises steeply, passing an active ski resort below the summit of the steep and ancient ridge. Bellvale flags, Middle Devonian layers of sandstone were first identified by N.H. Darton in 1894 in this area. A hawkwatch tower crowns the peak of Mount Peter and the Appalachian Trail crosses the highway on the east face of Bellvale Mountain to the south and Bearfort Mountain to the north. A local dairy in the valley below provides the milk for an ice cream parlor serving passing Appalachian Trail hikers and motorists. After crossing the ridgeline NY17A descends toward the village of Greenwood Lake, where it turns eastward again toward Sterling Forest.

Northward, Lower Wisner Road, named from a prominent early valley family, forks left at the location of Crawley's destroyed mill; Iron Forge Road passes Iron Forge Inn, a restaurant based in a 1760-built grist mill and the former Bellvale United Methodist Church, which had served Bellvale residents as a church for more than 150 years (beginning in 1853). Westward, NY17A rises and falls on foothill ridges of nearby Mount Warwick, passing historic homes and apple orchards before entering the Village of Warwick.

=== Climate ===
Bellvale is located in the humid continental climate zone (Köppen climate classification: Dfa), exhibiting four distinct seasons. Its climate is typical of Mid-Atlantic U.S. areas removed from bodies of water. The hamlet is located in plant hardiness zone 6a although much of surrounding Orange County varies from 6 to 7, indicating a cool temperate climate. Summers are warm, spring and fall are mild, with low humidity, while winter is cool, with annual snowfall averaging 23.0 inches (58 cm). Average winter lows tend to be around 20 °F (−5 °C) from mid-December to mid-February. Blizzards affect Bellvale most years. The most violent nor'easters typically feature high winds, heavy rains, and occasional snow. These storms often affect large sections of the U.S. East Coast.

The highest recorded temperature was 101 °F (38 °C) in 1995, while the lowest recorded temperature was −23 °F (−31 °C) in 1994.

Climate data for Bellvale, New York
Month	Jan	Feb	Mar	Apr	May	Jun	Jul	Aug	Sep	Oct	Nov	Dec	Year
Record high °F (°C)	66 (19)	73 (23)	85 (29)	92 (33)	93 (34)	97 (36)	101 (38)	97 (36)	100 (38)	88 (31)	78 (26)	71 (22)	101 (38)
Mean daily maximum °F (°C)	35 (2)	39 (4)	49 (9)	61 (16)	72 (22)	80 (27)	84 (29)	82 (28)	75 (24)	64 (18)	51 (11)	40 (4)	61 (16)
Mean daily minimum °F (°C)	18 (−8)	19 (−7)	28 (−2)	38 (3)	49 (9)	57 (14)	62 (17)	61 (16)	54 (12)	43 (6)	34 (1)	24 (−4)	41 (5)
Record low °F (°C)	−23 (−31)	−18 (−28)	−7 (−22)	13 (−11)	29 (−2)	38 (3)	43 (6)	41 (5)	27 (−3)	20 (−7)	10 (−12)	−21 (−29)	−23 (−31)
Average precipitation inches (mm)	3.08 (78)	2.51 (64)	3.32 (84)	3.96 (101)	4.59 (117)	4.28 (109)	4.07 (103)	3.84 (98)	4.14 (105)	3.44 (87)	3.58 (91)	3.19 (81)	39.10 (993)
Source: The Weather Channel

== Economy ==
Bellvale, by virtue of its accessibility along the NY17A corridor, supports a handful of local businesses primarily within the tourism and hospitality industries. Bellvale Farms Creamery and Mount Peter Ski Area operate seasonally. The Iron Forge Inn restaurant, Bellvale Market grocer and Winslow Therapeutic Riding Center are open year-round.

Bellvale had previously been served by a post office for more than 160 years. Former Congressman John Hall attempted to assist locals in preserving the postal station (hosted in a general store), however the USPS abruptly closed the location in September 2010. While the hamlet retains the zip code 10912, residents now travel several miles to Greenwood Lake for postal service.

== Government ==
Bellvale is administered as a part of the town of Warwick. Michael Sweeton is the Warwick Town Supervisor, Marjorie Quackenbush is the Town Clerk. Floyd DeAngelo, Leonard DeBuck, Mickey Shuback, and James Gerstner serve on the Town Board, Gerstner also serving as Deputy Supervisor.

On the state level, Bellvale is represented in the New York State Assembly by Republican Karl Brabenec and in the State Senate by Democrat Elijah Reichlin-Melnick. The hamlet is served in the United States House of Representatives by Democrat Sean Patrick Maloney and in the Senate by Chuck Schumer and Kirsten Gillibrand, both Democrats.

== Transportation ==
New York State Route 17A serves Bellvale west to Warwick and east to Greenwood Lake and Tuxedo, passing through the mountainous Sterling Forest. Bellvale Lakes Road takes motorists north to Chester and Monroe. Upper and Lower Wisner roads join just before reaching King's Highway New York State Route 94. Cascade Road starts south and takes the traveler high up into an alpine valley, then loops back north toward Warwick after circling Mount Warwick. New Jersey Transit serves the stop in Bellvale with the 196 (express) and 197 (local) bus lines into Port Authority Bus Terminal.

== Education ==
The Bellvale public school community is served by the Warwick Valley Central School District (WVCSD). Elementary-aged children residing in Bellvale attend Park Avenue Elementary in east central Warwick village about two miles away. Older students attend Warwick Valley Middle School or Warwick Valley High School, both about five miles away on the western side of the village. Nearby St. Stephen-St. Edwards School provides Catholic school education for Pre K-8 grades. Cedarwood Christian School nearby also provides faith-based education for Pre K-8 grade students. Orange-Ulster BOCES provides vocational and technical education along with adult education and special education support.

== Religious organizations ==
Methodist meetings were held in the homes of their members as early as 1809, with circuit preachers visiting the valley from New Windsor. The upper floor of the schoolhouse provided meeting space for several early area Baptist, Reformed Dutch, and Methodist congregations for many years and the space was nicknamed "The Tabernacle." The Methodist congregation resolved to build a church, the cornerstone of which was laid April 27, 1853 and finally dedicated a year later. The church was solidly constructed of timber cut locally and sawed into planks in the mill standing upstream of the new church site.

The wooden building served the community for 86 years, providing the location for the Bellvale Circus, a popular summer entertainment staffed by local residents. The church suffered catastrophic fire damage in early 1940, and was demolished. The current church building began its career in Spring Glen, New York, where the congregation could no longer afford to host the church, and they sold it to the Bellvale congregation for one dollar. The chapel was carefully disassembled and the building, pews, stained-glass windows, and organ were lovingly reassembled on the repaired foundation.

== Notable people ==
- Lydia Sayer Hasbrouck, suffragist and advocate for reform of attire for women
- Joe Jackson Sr. (born Joseph Jiranek, 1873–1942), trick cyclist

== See also ==
- Sterling Forest State Park
