= Lydia Sayer Hasbrouck =

American activist; newspaper founder, editor

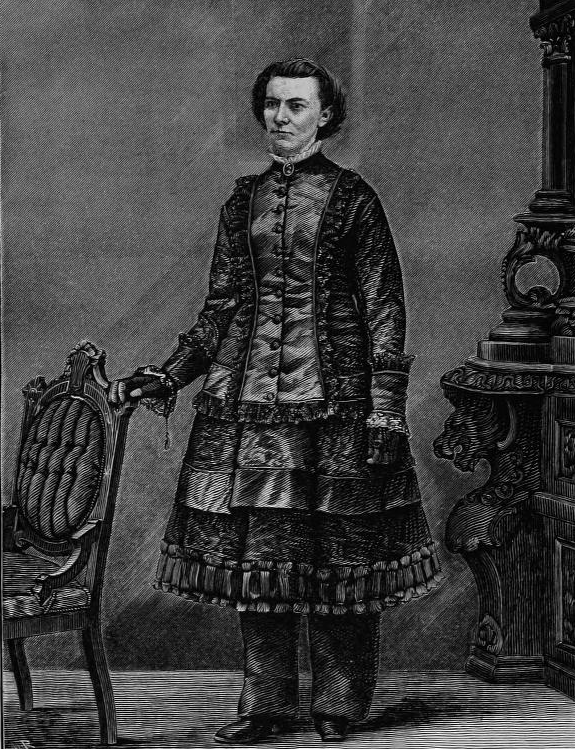
- Born: Lydia Sayer; December 20, 1827; Bellvale, New York
- Died: August 24, 1910 (aged 82); Middletown, Orange County, New York
- Education: Hygeio-Therapeutic College
- Occupations: Hydrotherapist, editor, dress reform advocate, periodical founder
- Spouse: John Whitbeck Hasbrouck (1826–1906)
- Children: Daisy, Sayer, Burt
- Writing career
- Language: English

Lydia Sayer Hasbrouck (December 20, 1827 – August 24, 1910) was an American hydrotherapist, an advocate for women's dress reform, and the founder and editor of The Sibyl, a periodical devoted to that attire reform topic. Elected to the Middletown, New York, Board of Education in 1880, she was one of the first women to hold elected office in the United States.

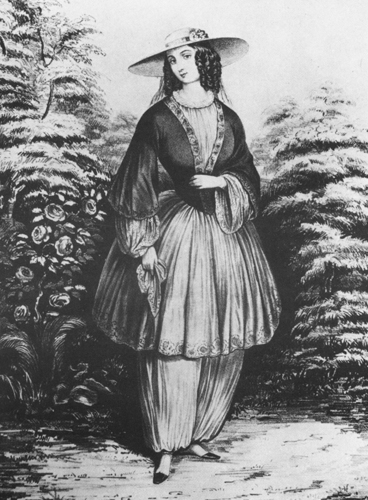
Woman wearing the bloomer, 1850s

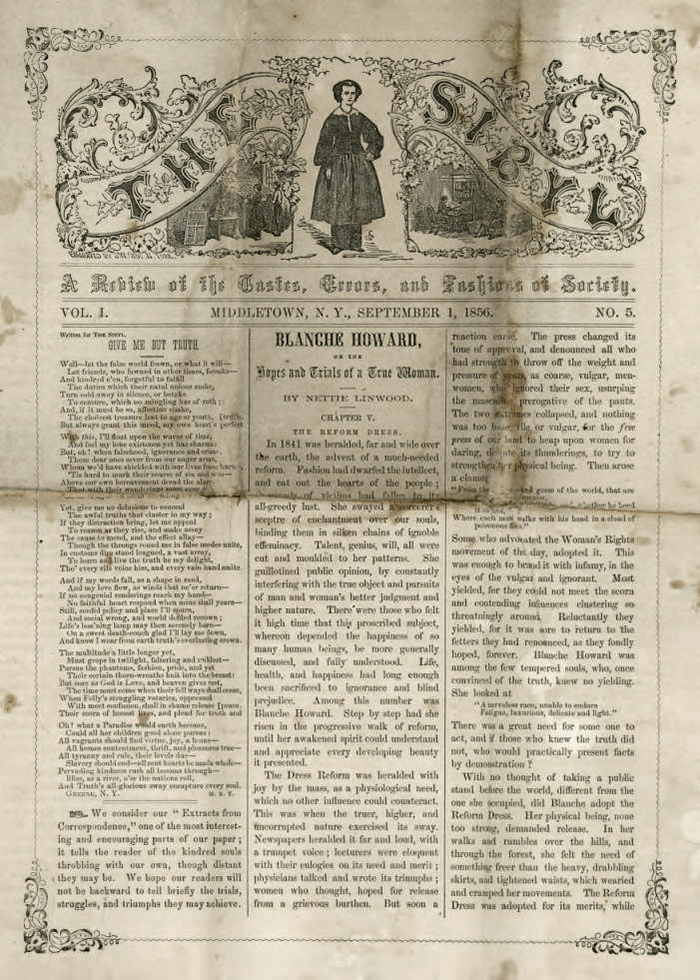
The Sibyl, vol. 1, no. 5, September 1, 1856

== Early life and education ==
Born Lydia Sayer near the hamlet of Bellvale, New York, she was the daughter of Rebecca (Forshee) Sayer and Benjamin Sayer, a farmer and distiller.

In 1849, she adopted the then-radical style of clothing known as the bloomer or reform dress — an adaptation of Turkish pantaloons with a knee-length overskirt. When she applied to the Seward Seminary in Florida, she was told that she could not be admitted unless she stopped wearing the reform dress. She refused and had to finish her education elsewhere. She later recounted that this experience "anchored me in the ranks of women's rights advocates", and she resolved to fight for women's "physical, political, and educational freedom and equality". She wore the reform dress throughout her life, including at her wedding.

She continued her education at Elmira Academy and then studied hydropathy at the Hygeio-Therapeutic College in New York City from which she was graduated. Because of their interest in alternative paths to health, hydropaths were among the most active champions of dress reform in the United States. Lydia then moved to Washington, D.C. where she practiced hydropathy and became a newspaper correspondent, writing for the Washington Star among other periodicals.

== The Sibyl ==
In 1856, John Whitbeck Hasbrouck (1826–1906), founder and editor of the reformist Middletown Whig Press in New York's Hudson Valley, invited her to take part in a lecture tour about dress reform. They married a few months later and settled in Middletown, where they built an unusual octagonal house inspired by the ideas of phrenologist Orson Squire Fowler. Lydia and John had three children, Daisy (who died as a child), Sayer, and Burt.

That same year, Hasbrouck founded her own periodical, The Sibyl, with John as its publisher. Subtitled "A Review of the Tastes, Errors and Fashions of Society", The Sibyl advocated for women's dress reform because Hasbrouck believed that women would not be able to compete on equal terms with men so long as they were hampered by the cumbersome and impractical clothing of the day. It served as the organ of the National Dress Reform Association, of which Hasbrouck was a member and later, (1863–65), was the president. Its contributors included suffragist Lucy Stone. Among other things, it published the names of almost a thousand women nationwide who had adopted the reform dress.

The Sibyl also advocated more generally for women's rights, universal suffrage, and the immediate abolition of slavery. Hasbrouck also argued in The Sibyl that women should not pay taxes so long as they were treated as inferior citizens, and she refused to pay taxes for a number of years. In 1863, she was made to work on a highway repair project in lieu of paying a road tax.

The Sibyl began as a biweekly and became a monthly in 1861. However, as the reform dress attracted criticism and mockery from those threatened by the prospect of women in 'men's' clothes, leaders of the women's rights movement distanced themselves from the dress reform movement. This shift, together with the advent of the Civil War, lost the paper its support, and it closed in 1864.

== Other activities ==
After The Sibyl went defunct, Hasbrouck worked as an editor for John's paper until it closed in 1868. Both Lydia and John then worked for a time on a reform-oriented periodical called the Liberal Sentinel.

In 1880, after New York passed a law allowing women to hold school-related offices, Hasbrouck was elected to the Middletown Board of Education. She is thought to be the first American woman to hold an elected office of any kind.

By the mid-1880s, she had moved into real estate and was partly responsible for developing a block of downtown Middletown.

She died of paresis at the age of 83.

== Legacy ==
Hasbrouck Street in Middletown was named after Lydia and John in the 1860s because it ran through their property. Their octagonal house, the only one ever built in Middletown, was demolished in 1919 in order to build Memorial School.
