= List of New Jersey Forest Fire Service fire towers =

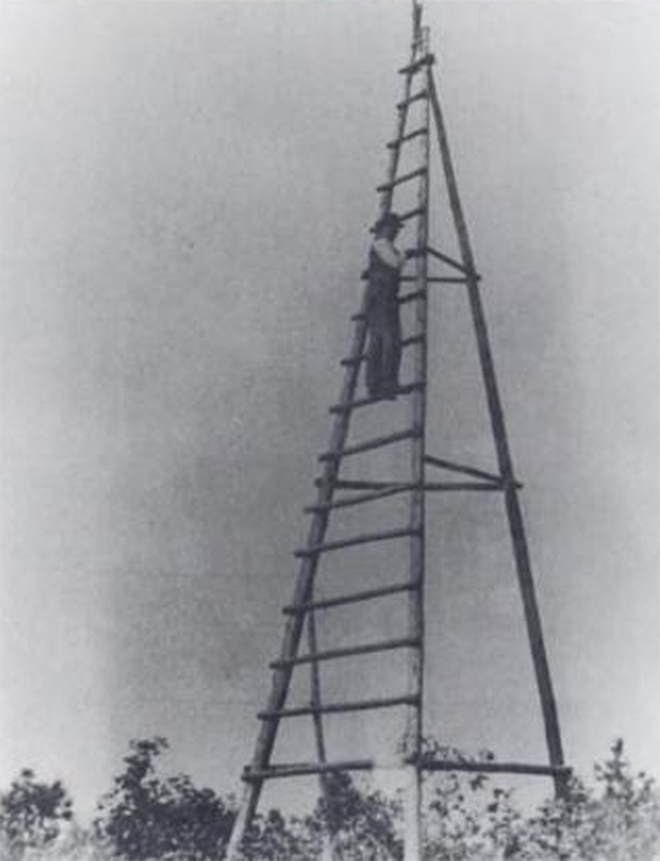
The New Jersey Forest Fire Service erected the "Four Mile Tower", a simple tripod of wooden poles, in 1910. It was replaced by the Lebanon Station.

In order to aid its efforts in wildland fire suppression and fire protection, the New Jersey Forest Fire Service operates a system of 21 fire towers at locations throughout the state of New Jersey in the United States. From these fire towers, using an instrument called the Osborne Fire Finder, or an alidade, and topographical maps, trained fire observers are able to spot and triangulate the location of possible wildfires. After ascertaining the location, the observer will file a "smoke report" which will be investigated and appropriate action taken by a local firewarden.

Founded in 1906, the New Jersey Forest Fire Service is the largest firefighting department within New Jersey and is an agency within the New Jersey Division of Parks and Forestry, a division of the New Jersey Department of Environmental Protection. With 85 full-time professional firefighters (career civil service positions), and approximately 2,000 trained part-time on-call wildland firefighters throughout the state, its mission is to protect "life and property, as well as the state's natural resources, from wildfire." The agency covers a primary response area of 3,719,638 acres (1,505,284 ha) comprising 77% of the state's land area and administered by three regional divisions. This primary response area includes the state's rural and suburban areas, as well as its public state parks and forests. In 2014, the New Jersey Forest Fire Service responded to 1,063 wildfire events that destroyed 6,692 acres (2,708 ha). The service conducted controlled burns or prescribed burns on 15,326 acres (6,202 ha) statewide.

The first fire lookout towers were often privately constructed during the late nineteenth century—many by large-tract landowners or corporations. However, after the creation of the Forest Fire Service, the state began erecting towers—some temporary, others permanent. The oldest erected by the Forest Fire Service that is in continuing operation is Culvers Station (then called the Normanook Fire Tower), first used in 1908, along the ridge of Kittatinny Mountain near Culver's Lake and the Culver's Gap. (Note: Although the Forest Fire Service's lookout at Bearfort Station was built earlier (1884), it was built by the Newark Watershed Commission and operated by them until 1916.) Many of the state's fire towers were built during the Great Depression by the Civilian Conservation Corps (CCC). More were erected during World War II, to aid both the Forest Fire Service and to the Aircraft Warning Service, operating from mid-1941 to mid-1944, in which fire observers were assigned additional duty as enemy aircraft spotters. During World War II, the Lakewood Station was "used to listen to German U-boat communications in the Atlantic Ocean 12 miles to the east". Fire towers are located at key points of observation and on diverse terrain from northern New Jersey's mountain-and-valley terrain to the comparatively flat and low-elevation coastal plains in the south and central sections of the state. Today, these 21 towers provide New Jersey an inexpensive and effective first response system that aids the New Jersey Forest Fire Service in quickly suppressing and in preventing damage caused by reported wildfires. The Forest Fire Service estimates that 25 percent of wildfires within the state every year are first spotted by a lookout.

A number of these fire towers are listed on the National Historic Lookout Register.

== List of fire towers ==
=== Fire towers in active service ===
US#	NJ#	Image	Tower Name	Elevation	Height	NJFFS Division Sections covered	Location of tower	County	Notes
44	1		Culvers Station (previously Normanook Fire Tower)	1,509 feet (460 m)	47 feet (14 m)	Div. A Sec. A1 (PA, NY)	Stokes State Forest, Sandyston Township; 41°11.270′N 74°45.988′W	Sussex	
45	2	-	Ramapo Station (previously Wind-beam Lookout)	1,011 feet (308 m)	50 feet (15 m)	Div. A Sec. A2 (A5&NY)	Ramapo Mountain State Forest; N41°03.521' W074°15.330'	Passaic	
244	6		Bearfort Station	1,331 feet (406 m)	68 feet (21 m)	Div. A Sec. A2, A5 (A1)	Bearfort Mountain; West Milford Township; 41°06.254′N 74°25.044′W	Passaic	
246	8		Budd Lake Station (previously 95 Mile Tree Lookout)	1,182 feet (360 m)	60 feet (18 m)	Div. A Sec. A6, A3,(A4, A8, A7)	Mount Olive Township; N40°53.704' W074°45.026'	Morris	
247	9		Catfish Station	1,555 feet (474 m)	60 feet (18 m)	Div. A Sec. A3 (A6, PA)	Delaware Water Gap National Recreation Area near Blairstown; N41°02.855' W074°58.347'	Warren	
553	12	-	Greystone Station	909 feet (277 m)	92 feet (28 m)	Div. A Sec. A7 A8,(A5, B10)	Union Hill, Denville; N40°51.341' W074°30.690'	Morris	
563	16	-	Milton Station	1,341 feet (409 m)	80 feet (24 m)	Div. A Sec. A4(A5)	Morris County Park; Jefferson Township; N41°00.520' W074°32.433'	Morris	
243	5		Bass River Station	47 feet (14 m)	80 feet (24 m)	Div. B Sec. B4, B2, C7	Bass River State Forest; 39°36.694′N 74°26.197′W	Burlington	
564	17		Apple Pie Hill Station	179 feet (55 m)	60 feet (18 m)	Div. B Sec. B1, B2, B3	Tabernacle Township; N39°48.443' W074°35.363'	Burlington	
565	18	-	Batsto Station	70 feet (21 m)	100 feet (30 m)	Div. B Sec. B2(B4, C8, C6)	Wharton State Forest; N39°38.976' W074°38.567'	Burlington	
248	10		Cedar Bridge Station	204 feet (62 m)	100 feet (30 m)	Div. B Sec. B7, B5, B4, B2	Lacey Township; N39°50.380' W074°22.836'	Ocean	
554	13	-	Jamesburg Station (previously Old Bridge Fire Tower)	48 feet (15 m)	60 feet (18 m)	Div. B Sec. B10, A7 (B9, A8)	Thompson County Park; Monroe Township; N40°20.233' W074°26.318'	Middlesex	
556	15	-	Lebanon Station	136 feet (41 m)	80 feet (24 m)	Div. B Sec. B3, B6,(B5, B2)	Brendan T. Byrne State Forest; N39°53.531' W074°34.880'	Burlington	
568	21	-	Medford Station	141 feet (43 m)	100 feet (30 m)	Div. B Sec. B1, B3(B2, C11)	Piper's Corner, Medford Township; N39°50.504' W074°47.375'	Burlington	
245	7	-	Belleplain Station	56 feet (17 m)	100 feet (30 m)	Div. C Sec. C2(C4, C5, C6)	Belleplain State Forest near Woodbine; N39°17.036' W074°50.948'	Cape May	
249	11		McKeetown Station	75 feet (23 m)	100 feet (30 m)	Div. C Sec. C6, C7,(C4, C5)	Egg Harbor Township; N39°26.304' W074°37.039'	Atlantic	
566	19	-	Blue Anchor Station	152 feet (46 m)	86 feet (26 m)	Div. C Sec. C11, C6, C9	Winslow Township; N39°40.978' W074°53.348'	Camden	
567	20	-	Dias Creek Station	13 feet (4.0 m)	100 feet (30 m)	Div. C Sec. C1, C2	Middle Township; N39°06.271' W074°52.699'	Cape May	
569	22	-	Millville Station	83 feet (25 m)	100 feet (30 m)	Div. C Sec. C3, C10,(C9)	Millville; N39°23.939' W075°04.436'	Cumberland	
570	23	-	Mizpah Station	106 feet (32 m)	100 feet (30 m)	Div. C Sec. C4, C5,(C9)	Mizpah, Hamilton Township; N39°28.989' W074°50.851'	Atlantic	

=== Fire towers not in service or no longer standing ===
US#	NJ#	Image	Tower Name	Elevation	Height	NJFFS Division Sections covered	Location of tower	County	Notes
79	3	"Batsto Mansion with Fire Tower on roof"	Batsto Mansion House Station (also known as Batsto Manor House Station)	72 feet (22 m)	-	Div. B	Batsto Village State Historic Site; N39°38.604' W074°38.893'	Burlington	
83	4		Green Pond Mountain Lookout (or Picatinny Arsenal Tower) (Note: According to Rieth, the Picatinny Arsenal Tower, which is located on a United States Army military research installation, is "not in service, but can be used". NOTE: This fire tower is not the 215 feet (66 m) grey metal tower operated by Picatinny Arsenal Precision Armaments Laboratory that is visible from New Jersey Route 15 in Jefferson Township.)	1,240 feet (380 m)	-	Div. A	Picatinny Arsenal; Jefferson Township; N40°57.003' W074°34.132'	Morris	
555	14	-	Lakewood Station	136 feet (41 m)	80 feet (24 m)	Div. B Sec. B7, B8, B9(B5, B6, B10)	Lakewood; N40°04.234' W074°13.674'	Ocean	

== See also ==
- List of New Jersey state firewardens
- Wildfire suppression
