= Fairview Peak (Gunnison County, Colorado) =

Mountain in Gunnison County, Colorado, United States

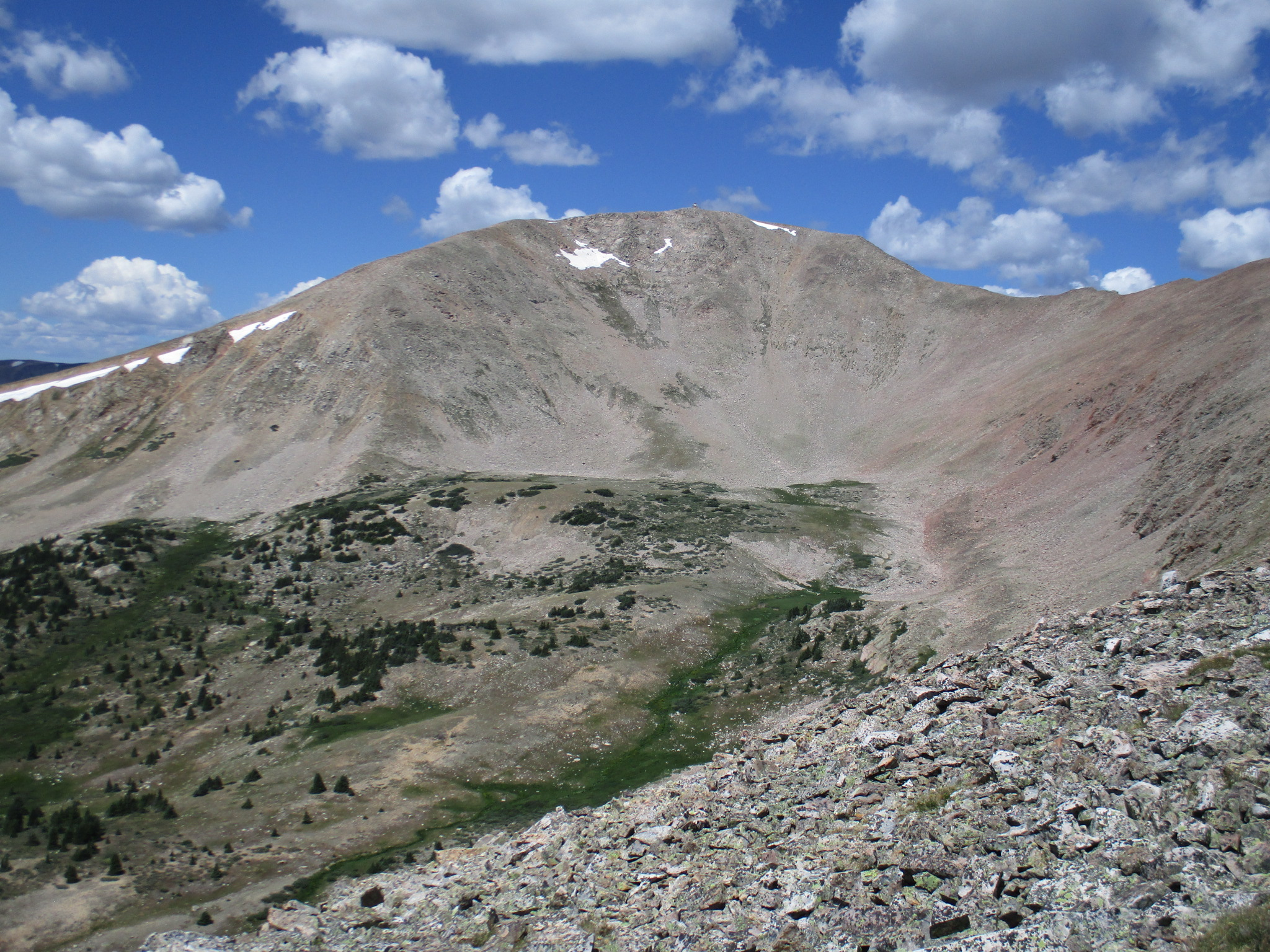
- Fairview Peak viewed from the east.

Highest point
- Elevation: 13,214 ft (4,028 m)
- Prominence: 1,214 ft (370 m)
- Isolation: 4.56 mi (7.34 km)
- Coordinates: 38°41′00″N 106°32′13″W

Geography
- Location within Colorado
- Location: Gunnison County, Colorado, US
- Parent range: Sawatch Range
- Topo map(s): USGS 7.5' topographic map Fairview Peak

Climbing
- Easiest route: class 1

Fairview Peak is mountain summit in the Sawatch Range of the Rocky Mountains of North America. The 13,214 feet (4,028 m) mountain is located in Gunnison County, Colorado, and in the Gunnison National Forest.

== Geology ==
During the Laramide Orogeny the area near Fairview Peak was lifted and Proterozoic basement rocks and overlying Paleozoic sedimentary rock were raised high above nearby valleys. After this uplift approximately 65 to 75 million years ago, there was a long period of erosion. The erosion of uplands and the accumulation of sediments in the valleys largely leveled the landscape. Approximately 34 million years ago, the Proterozoic and Paleozoic rocks were intruded by magma resulting in granitic stocks, dikes, and sills. Renewed uplift approximately 10 million years ago raised the region to the heights seen today. Fairview Peak was glaciated, and the most prominent glacial cirques are located on the north and east sides of the mountain where tarns and glacial deposits are found.

The Fairview Peak area is part of the Colorado Mineral Belt. While the mountain itself is dominated by Proterozoic granodiorite, the lower slopes to the south and east consist of outcrops of Paleozoic sedimentary rocks and Middle Tertiary intrusive rocks. Mining of gold, silver, and lead began in the late 1800s and resulted in the establishment of numerous mining camps and the nearby towns of Tincup and Pitkin.

== Climate ==
Fairview Peak's climate is classified as a tundra climate (ET) in the Köppen system and more specifically as an alpine climate, with cold, snowy winters and cool summers. It receives precipitation as snow in winter and as thunderstorms in summer, with June typically being a drier month.

== Fairview Peak Lookout ==
On the summit of Fairview Peak is the Fairview Peak Lookout. The one-room stone structure with a second-story wooden cupola is the highest-elevation fire lookout constructed in the United States. Built in 1912 by the United States Forest Service, this lookout was staffed only a few years. Repeated lightning strikes and the country's involvement in World War I are cited as reasons the structure was abandoned. Later, the structure was used to house radio equipment, but lightning again prevented continued use. More recently, restoration work has helped preserve this historic lookout.

== Hiking ==
Hiking to the summit of Fairview Peak is typically done during the summer and early fall when snow is free of the roads used to reach the trailheads. The easiest route to the summit starts at the Fairview Peak Trailhead located on the southern shoulder of the mountain. A 0.8-mile (1.3 km) trail leads to the summit with 900 feet (274 m) of elevation gain. The Fairview Peak Trailhead is 7 miles (11 km) north of Pitkin at the end of Forest Road 770. High-clearance four-wheel-drive vehicles are recommended to reach the trailhead.

Fairview Peak can also be reached from Cumberland Pass. Old mining roads can be followed to hike along the ridge southwest to Green Mountain. From there, an off-trail ridge hike leads west to the summit. This class 2 route is 3.6 miles (5.8 km) and the elevation gain is 1,850 feet (564 m).

== Historical names ==
- Fairview Mountain
- Mount Fairview
- Fairview Peak
