= List of New Jersey state firewardens =

In the state of New Jersey in the United States, a State Firewarden is appointed as the administrative director of the New Jersey Forest Fire Service. The New Jersey Forest Fire Service is an agency within the state's Department of Environmental Protection (NJDEP) and directly overseen by that department's Division of Parks and Forestry. Founded in 1906 with a focus on wildland fire suppression and fire protection, the New Jersey Forest Fire Service is the largest firefighting department within the state of New Jersey with 89 full-time professional firefighters (career civil service positions), and approximately 2,000 trained part-time on-call wildland firefighters throughout the state. Its mission is to protect "life and property, as well as the state's natural resources, from wildfire".

Pursuant to N.J.S.A 13:9-13, the New Jersey Forest Fire Service is led by a "State Firewarden" serving under the NJDEP Commissioner who "shall administer and supervise the Forest Fire Service, cooperating agencies, and such laws as shall deal with the protection of forests, from wildfire". The current state firewarden is William Donnelly. Fourteen individuals have occupied the State Firewarden position since the establishment of the Forest Fire Service in 1906.

== List of state firewardens ==
| # | Name | Tenure |
|---|---|---|
| 1 | Theophilus P. Price | 1906–1910 |
| 2 | Charles P. Wilber | 1910–1923 |
| 3 | Leonidas Coyle | 1923–1937 |
| 4 | LeRoy S. Fales | 1937–1944 |
| 5 | William J. Seidel | 1944–1960 |
| 6 | R. Wesley Davis | 1960–1968 |
| 7 | William B. Phoenix | 1968–1975 |
| 8 | James A. Cumming, Jr. | 1975–1982 |
| 9 | David B. Harrison | 1982–2001 |
| 10 | Maris G. Gabliks | 2001–2011 |
| 11 | Michael Drake | 2011–2012 |
| 12 | William P. Edwards | 2013–2017 |
| 13 | Steve Holmes | 2017–2018 |
| 14 | Gregory McLaughlin | 2018–2023 |
| 15 | William Donnelly | 2024–present |

== See also ==
- Government of New Jersey
- List of New Jersey Forest Fire Service fire towers
- List of New Jersey administrative agencies
- Wildfire suppression
