= Mount Peter (New York) =

Mountain in New York, United States

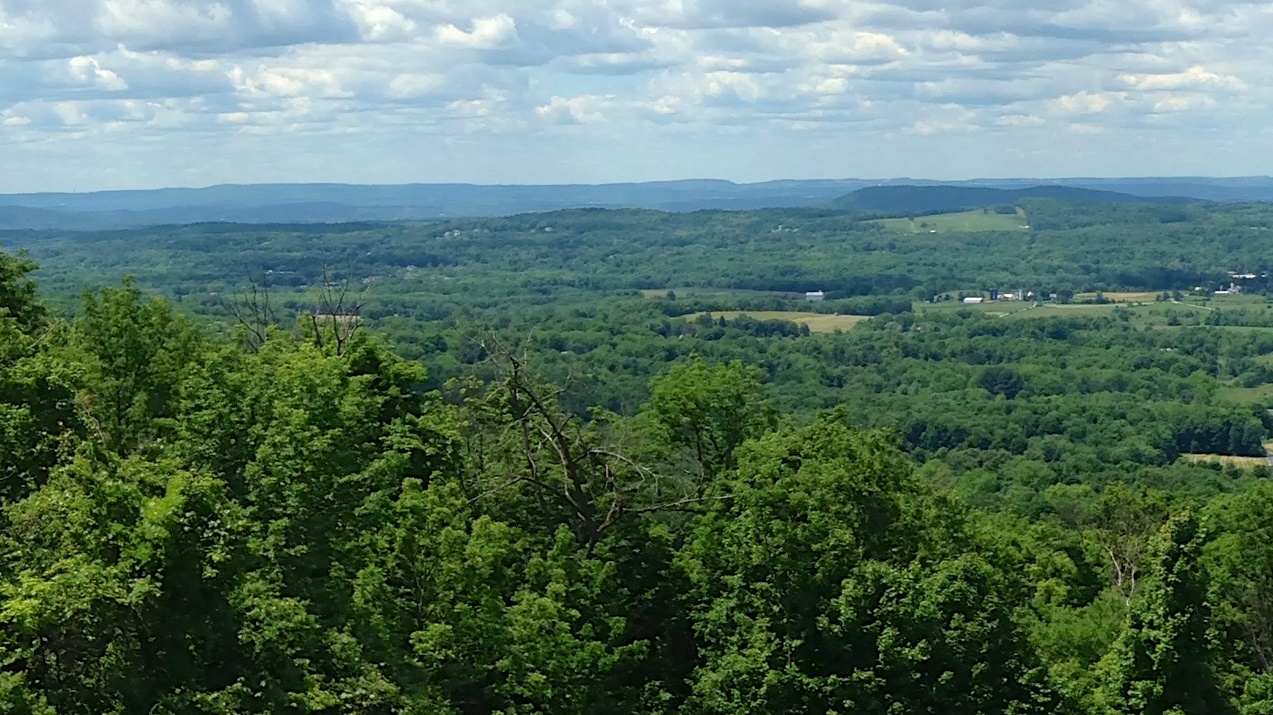
- View of the Warwick Valley from Mount Peter hawk watch

Highest point
- Elevation: 1,250 ft (380 m)
- Coordinates: 41°14′29″N 74°17′26″W

Naming
- Etymology: Peter Conklin

Geography
- Location: Bellvale Mountain, Town of Warwick, Orange County, New York, U.S.
- Parent range: New York – New Jersey Highlands
- Topo map: USGS Greenwood Lake

Geology
- Rock age: Devonian

Mount Peter is a 1,250-foot (380 m) mountain located in the New York – New Jersey Highlands, Bellvale Mountain, in the U.S. state of New York. The peak is located along the Appalachian Trail in the Town of Warwick, just south of New York State Route 17A, 38 miles (61 km) northwest of New York City, 2 miles (3.2 km) east of Bellvale, New York and north northwest of Greenwood Lake, New York.

The mountain is named after an early pioneer to the area, Peter Conklin. A hawkwatch tower occupies a summit just north of Mount Peter; below the tower the Bellvale Farms Creamery serves hikers and passing motorists. A small ski area occupies the northward-facing slope of the mountain.

== Ski area ==
Mount Peter is home to a skiing, snowboarding, and tubing area of the same name. Originally opened in 1936 as a showcase for Macy's ski apparel, the ski area occupies the mountains northern slope and features 13 trails, 1 terrain park and is served by 1 quad chair lift, 2 double chair lifts, and 4 carpet lifts. The mountain continues operations today as the oldest operating ski area in New York and one of the only family run slopes in the region. The resort also features a full base lodge complete with cafeteria, Pete's Pub bar, and brand new rental facilities along with an apparel, gear, and gift shop. The mountain is lighted for night skiing and tubing and features snowmaking on all trails.
