= Blistered Horn Mill, Colorado =

Blistered Horn Mill
- Brunswick Mill
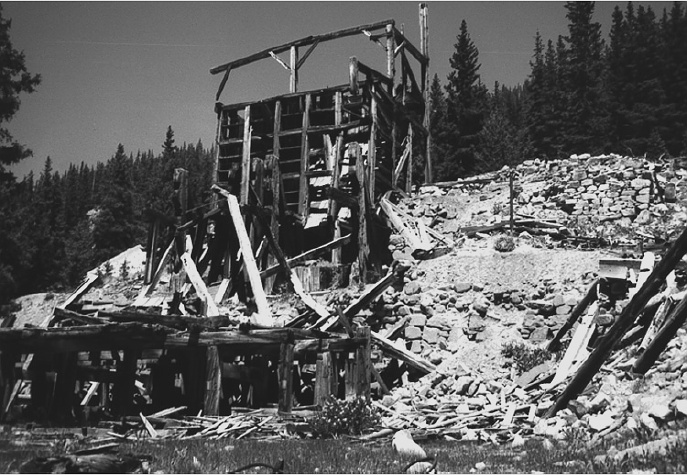
- Blistered Horn Mill, circa 1998.

- Location within Colorado Location within the United States
- 38°42′08″N 106°29′31″W
- Location: Gunnison County, Colorado
- Nearest city: Tincup, Colorado

History
- Built: Circa 1890
- Built for: Brunswick Mining and Milling Company

Site notes
- Elevation: 10,938 feet (3,334 m)

Blistered Horn Mill, also known as the Brunswick Mill, is an abandoned stamp mill located 4 miles (6.4 km) south of Tincup in Gunnison County, Colorado, United States. Built around 1890 by the Brunswick Mining and Milling Company, the mill processed gold ore from the nearby Jimmy Mack and Blistered Horn Tunnel mines.

The mill had the capacity to process 100 tons of ore daily. A 20-stamp mill ground the ore, powered by a 150-horsepower engine. The boilers were fueled by wood and coal.

Today the mill is partially collapsed. The ruins are accessed off Gunnison County Road 765, about 4 miles (6.4 km) north of Cumberland Pass.
