= Puddingstone (rock) =

Colorful conglomerate rock

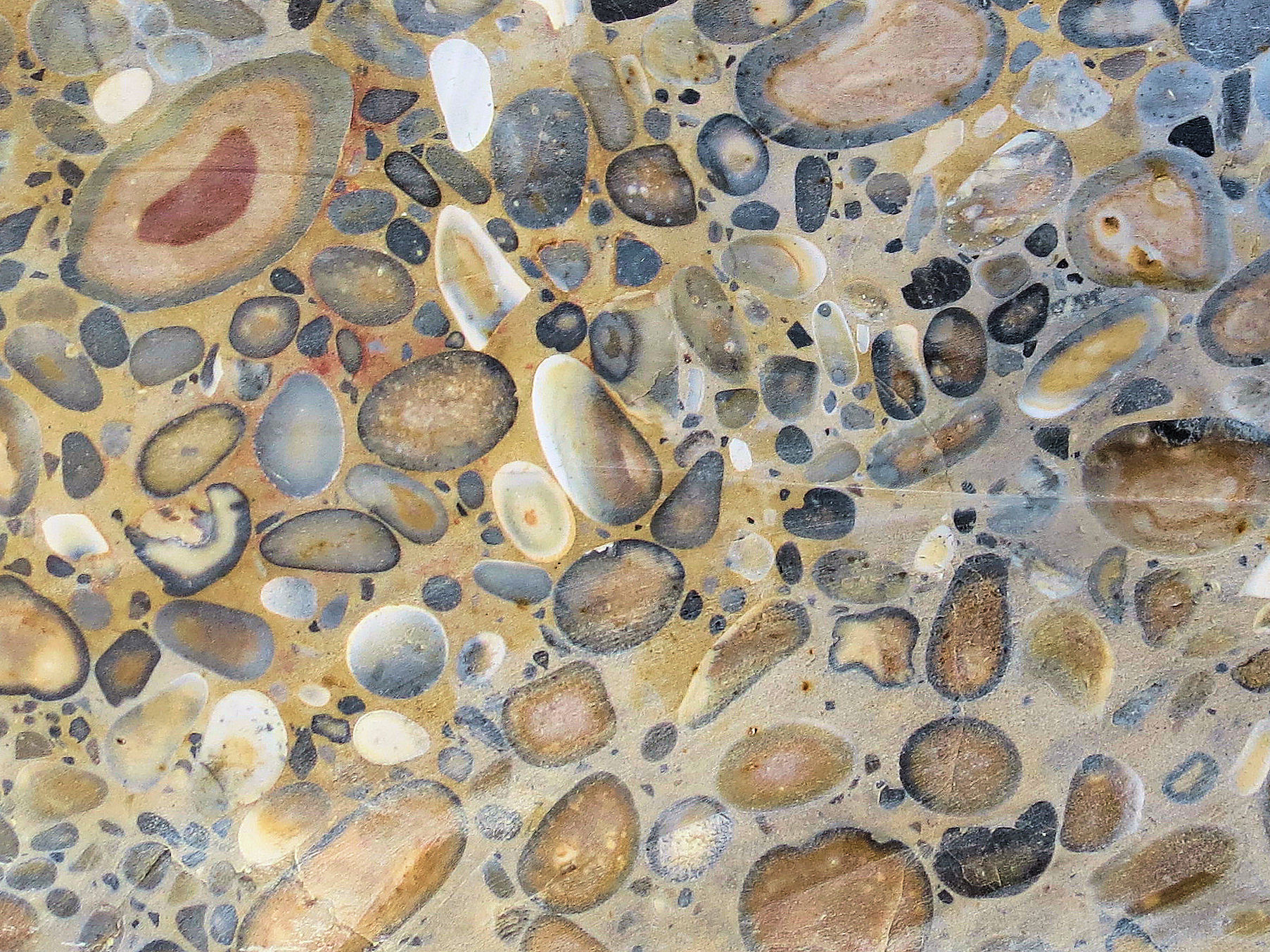

Puddingstone, also known as either pudding stone or plum-pudding stone, is a popular name applied to a type of conglomerate that consists of distinctly rounded pebbles whose colours contrast sharply with the colour of the finer-grained, often sandy, matrix or cement surrounding them. The rounded pebbles and the sharp contrast in colour gives this type of conglomerate the appearance of a raisin or Christmas pudding. There are different types of puddingstone, with different composition, origin, and geographical distribution. Examples of different types of puddingstones include the Hertfordshire, Schunemunk, Roxbury, and St. Joseph Island (Drummond Island) puddingstones.

== Hertfordshire puddingstone ==
Hertfordshire puddingstone is a silica-cemented conglomerate composed of rounded flint pebbles and cobbles with matrix of fine sand and silica cement. The Hertfordshire Puddingstone is characterized by silica-cemented flint gravel that is brown to deep red in colour and often exhibits black exteriors and thin rinds on cut or polished surfaces. It typically occurs scattered across the land surface as isolated concretion-like masses in the areas of Hertfordshire and Plumstead Common, England. Large masses of Hertfordshire Puddingstone often occur within local Pleistocene glacial tills. It is suggested that the conglomerate began as flint pebbles deposited above the Upnor Formation, which were weathered and mixed with fine white sand, cementing early during the Reading Formation. More than a dozen large blocks of this puddingstone were recovered from Paleogene sediments during construction of the A10 bypass from Thundridge to Puckeridge in 2004. This indicates that the loose blocks of Hertfordshire Puddingstone were probably eroded out of these sediments. Although it is hypothesized that it is groundwater silcrete, its origin remains unresolved.

== Schunemunk puddingstone ==
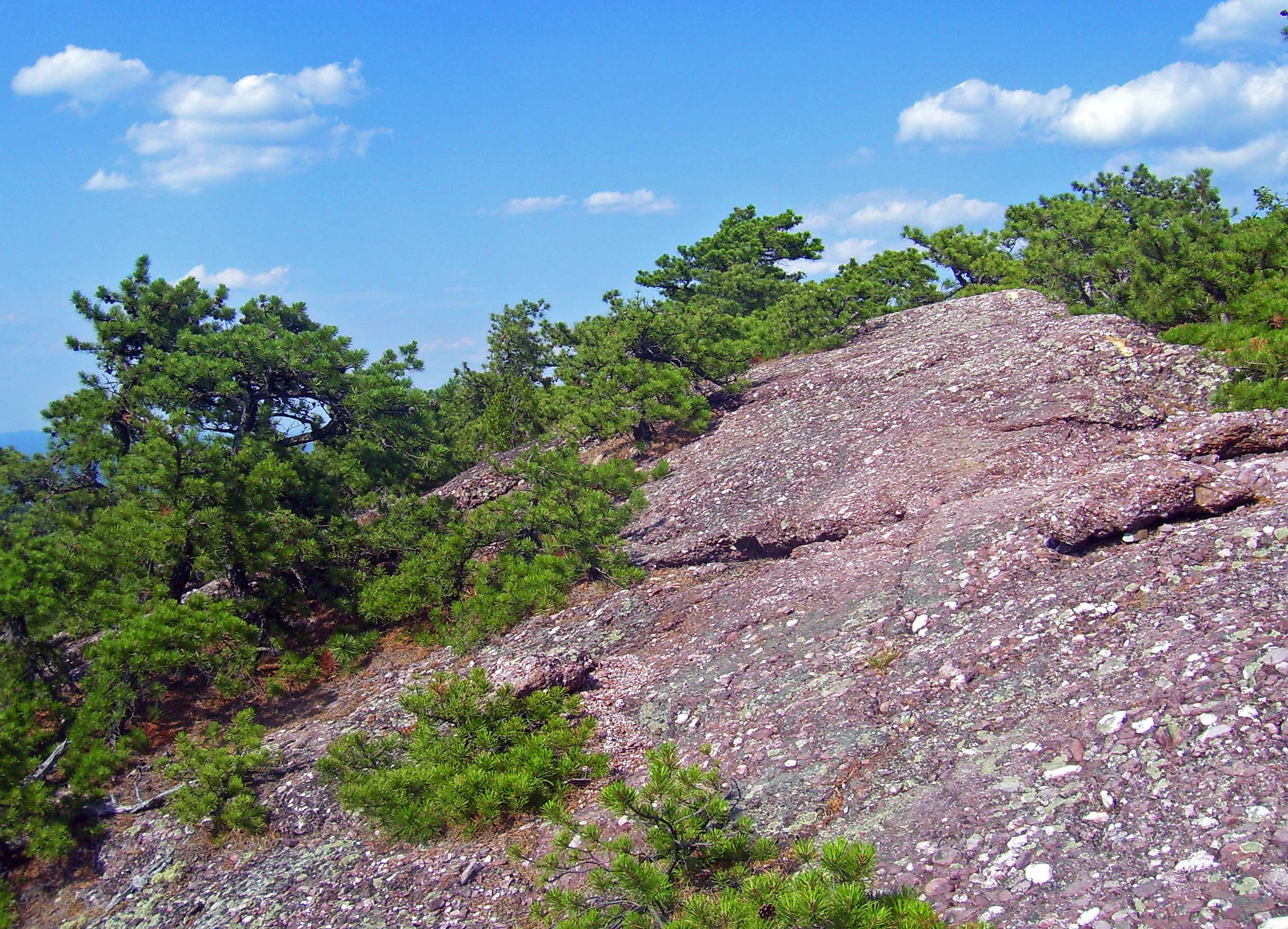
Schunemunk conglomerate

The Schunemunk puddingstone is a conglomerate in New York and New Jersey that is part of a 3,000 feet (910 m) thick geologic formation formally known as the Skunnemunk Conglomerate. It is exposed extensively on Bearfort Mountain, in Boonton and Rockaway Township in New Jersey and on Schunemunk Mountain in New York. This puddingstone is a distinctive, Late Devonian, grayish-purple to grayish-red, thin to very thick-bedded, cross–bedded, conglomerate. Within the Skunnemunk Conglomerate, it is interbedded with grayish-purple to grayish-red sandstone, thin-bedded, medium-gray sandstone, and greenish-gray and grayish-red shale with mudcracks. This conglomerate consists of pebbles and cobbles of white vein quartz, red and green quartzite, sandstone, red and gray chert, and red shale. The grayish-purple to grayish-red conglomerate and sandstone is cemented largely by hematite and microcrystalline quartz. The cobbles that it contains range in size from 2.5 in (6.4 cm) to 6.5 in (17 cm). Pieces of Skunnemunk Conglomerate are easy to recognize and have been found in glacial deposits throughout the lower Hudson Valley region.

== Roxbury puddingstone ==
Roxbury puddingstone

The Roxbury puddingstone is a massive, Ediacaran, clast-supported pebble and cobble conglomerate that occurs within the Brookline Member of the Roxbury Conglomerate that is exposed around Boston, Massachusetts region. This conglomerate is composed of a grey feldspathic sand matrix and well-rounded pebbles and cobbles of quartzite, granite, felsite, and quartz monzonite. The beds of ‘puddingstone’ are complexly interbedded with layers of massive diamictite and laminated and graded argillite and sandstone. It likely accumulated as turbidites and submarine slumps within a submarine fan or outer slope environment within a deep rift basin submerged by marine waters.

== Jasper conglomerate ==
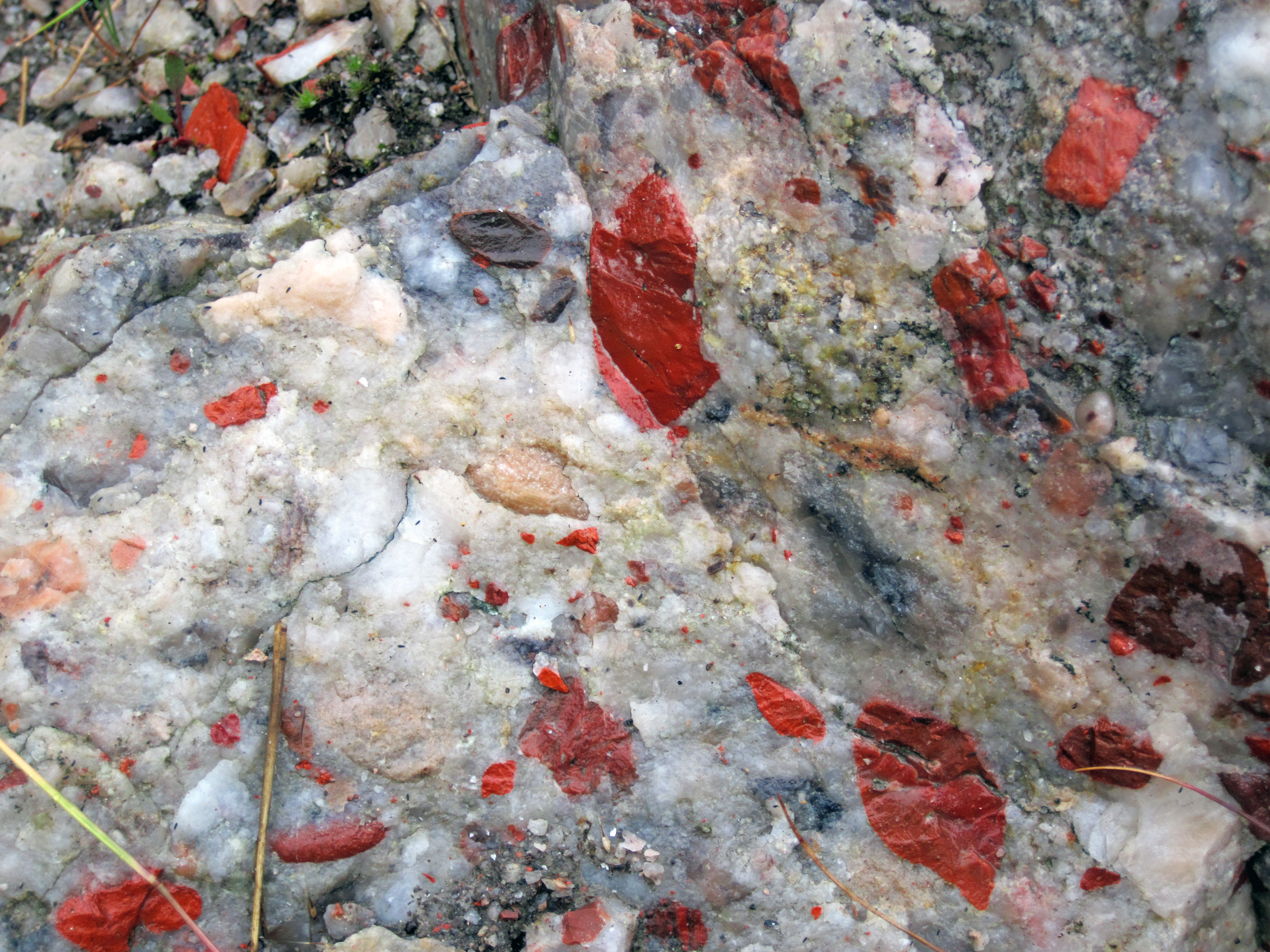
Jasper-quartz pebble conglomerate from Ontario, Canada

Jasper conglomerate, which is also denominated "pebble jasper conglomerate", "St. Joseph Island puddingstone", "Drummond Island puddingstone", or "Michigan(ian) puddingstone", occurs in St. Joseph Island and the vicinity of the St. Marys River, north and northwest of Bruce Mines in Northern Ontario, Canada, about 65 kilometres (40 mi) east of Sault Ste. Marie, Ontario. Along the north shore of Lake Huron, thick beds of Paleoproterozoic pebble conglomerate located within the medial part of the Lorrain Formation, a geologic formation of the Cobalt Group of the Huronian Supergroup. The jasper conglomerate consists of subrounded pebbles of red jasper, black chert, white quartzite, hematite, and semi-transparent quartz in a matrix of coarsely grained quartzite. The composition of Jasper conglomerate is 30% to 90% pebbles. Lorrian quartzite, consisting a lower level of red quartzite, a middle red jasper conglomerate, and the upper level of white quartzite, each of equal thickness, is local only to the Bruce Mines area, with conglomerate outside the area almost devoid of jasper pebbles. Within the deposits of Lorrain Formation, the jasper conglomerates occur principally as the sedimentary fills of erosional troughs and channels of what are interpreted to be either alluvial fans or deposits of braided river. These deposits are inferred to be nonglacial in origin and immediately postdate the Paleoproterozoic Makganyene glaciation.

Elsewhere, e. g. in Drummond Island, Michigan, United States, jasper conglomerate, there denominated "Drummond Island puddingstone", occurs as loose gravel within Pleistocene glacial drift. These fragments of jasper conglomerate are glacial erratics that continental ice sheets from Northern Ontario eroded and then spread throughout Michigan, including in Drummond Island, and as far south as Ohio and Kentucky during repeated glacial advances and retreats.

== Other examples ==
- Schirmeck, France
- Fairburn, South Dakota
- Farringdon, England
- East Worldham, England
- Bayfield, Colorado
- Shawangunk Conglomerate
