= Skunnemunk Conglomerate =

- Stratigraphic range: Middle Devonian
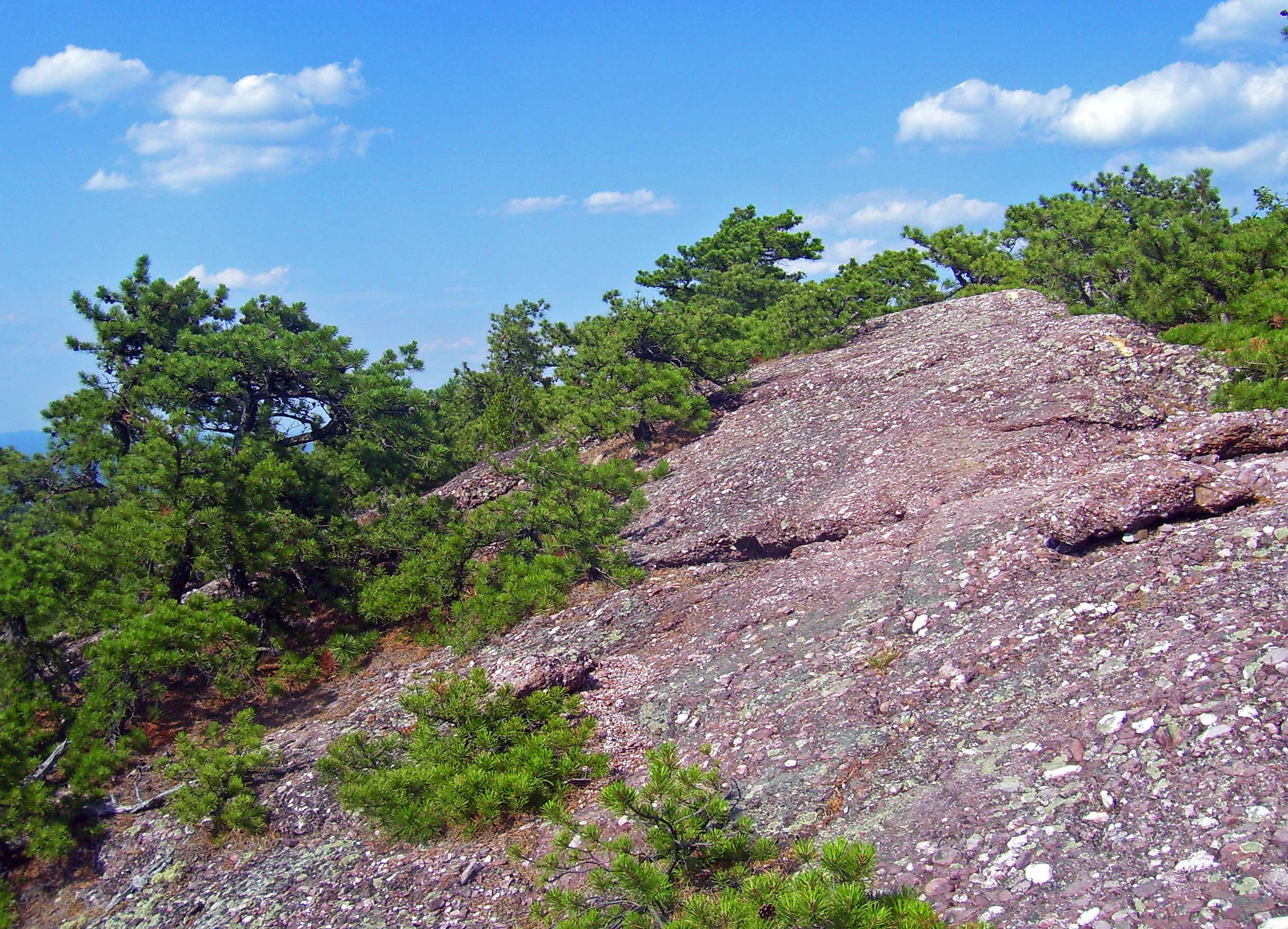
- Conglomerate rock typical of Schunemunk Mountain, New York.
- Type: Geological formation
- Unit of: Green Pond Outlier
- Overlies: Bellvale Sandstone
- Thickness: About 3,000 ft.

Lithology
- Primary: Conglomerate, Sandstone

Location
- Extent: New Jersey, New York

The Skunnemunk Conglomerate (also spelled Schunemunk) is a mapped bedrock unit in New Jersey and New York from the Middle Devonian period. It forms the resistant ridge of Schunemunk Mountain in New York and Bearfort Mountain in New Jersey.

== Description ==
The Skunnemunk is a Middle Devonian, grayish-purple to grayish-red, thin to very thick-bedded, locally cross–bedded, conglomerate and sandstone containing clasts of white vein quartz, red and green quartzite and sandstone, red and gray chert, and red shale. It is a classic Puddingstone. Pieces of the conglomerate are easy to recognize and have been found in glacial deposits throughout the lower Hudson Valley region.
