= Fire lookout tower =

Building to house a person who watches for wildfires

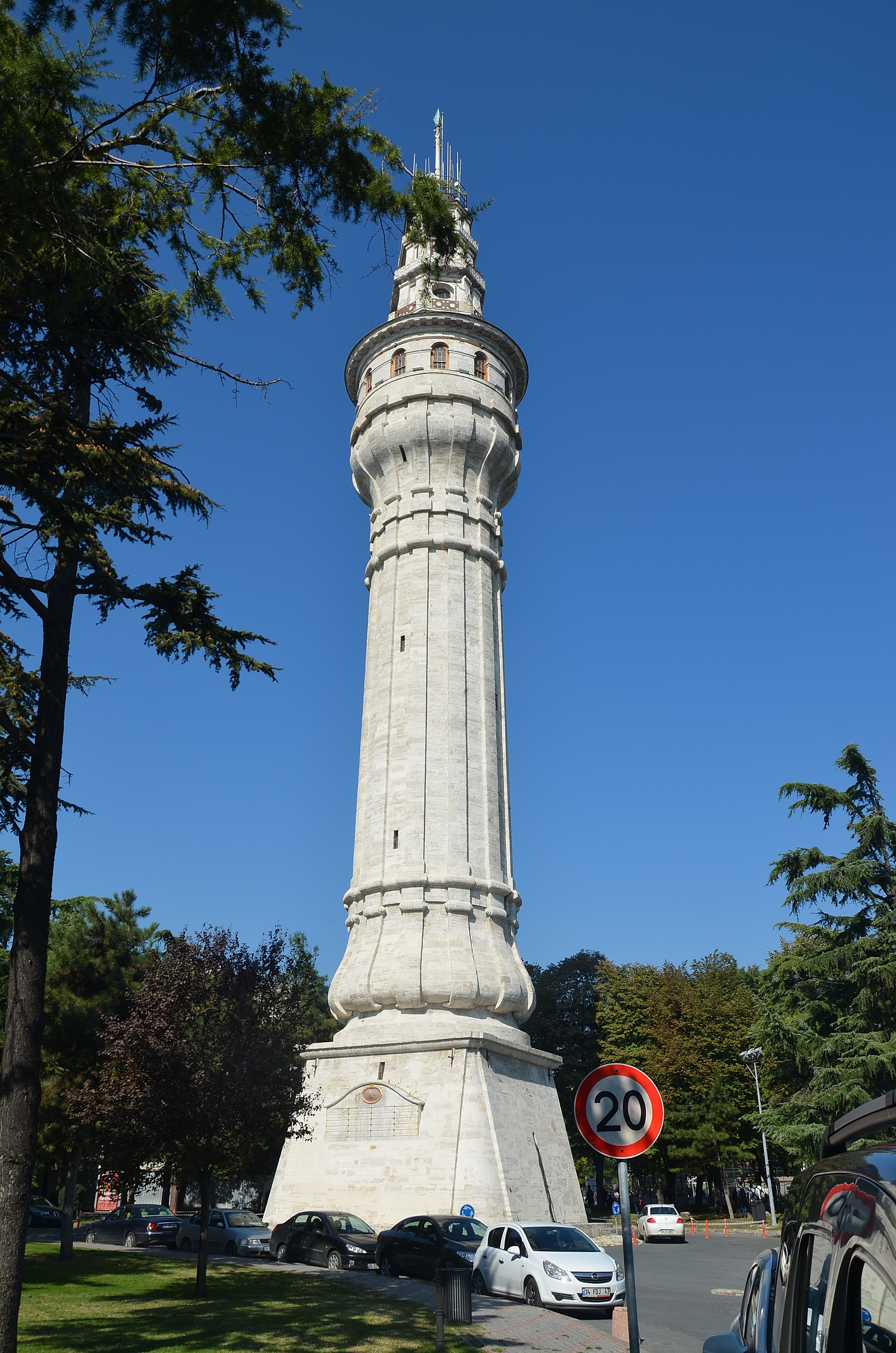
Beyazıt Tower, an 85-meter-tall (279 ft) fire lookout tower at Beyazıt Square in Istanbul

A fire lookout tower, fire tower, or lookout tower is a tower that allows firefighters or park rangers to view and spot wildfires. Towers are usually on the summit of a mountain or other high vantage point to maximize viewing distance and range. From this vantage point the fire lookout can see smoke that may develop, determine the location by possibly using a device known as an Osborne Fire Finder, and call for wildfire suppression crews. Lookouts also report weather changes and plot the location of lightning strikes during storms. The location of the strike is monitored for a period of days afterwards, in case of ignition.

A typical fire lookout tower consists of a small room, known as a cab, atop a large steel or wooden tower. Historically, the tops of tall trees have also been used to mount permanent platforms. . In cases where the terrain makes a tower unnecessary, the structure is known as a ground cab. Ground cabs are called towers, even if they do not sit on a tower.

Towers gained popularity in the early 1900s, and fires were reported using telephones, carrier pigeons and heliographs.

Although many fire lookout towers have fallen into disrepair from neglect, abandonment and declining budgets, some fire service personnel have made efforts to preserve older fire towers, because it is true that a person watching the forest for wildfire can be an effective and cheap fire control measure.

== History ==
=== United States ===
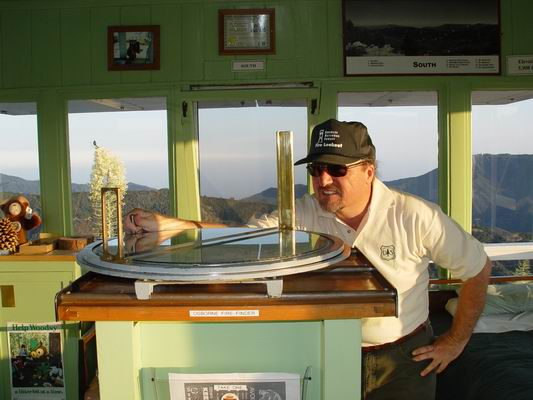
A fire lookout uses an Osborne Fire Finder to obtain the azimuth and distance to a suspected fire. From these measurements he will call in a "Smoke Report."

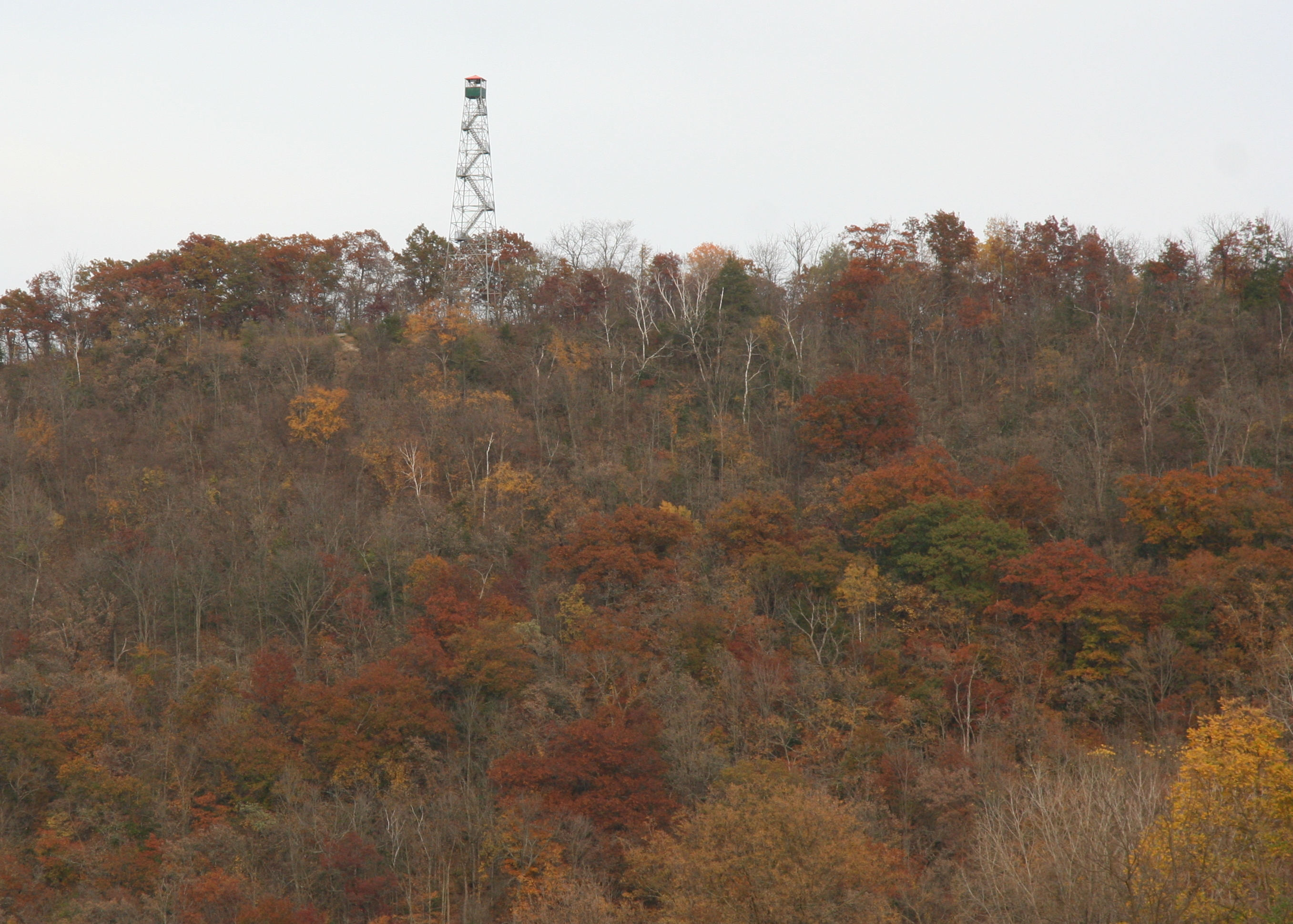
Elba Fire Tower in Minnesota

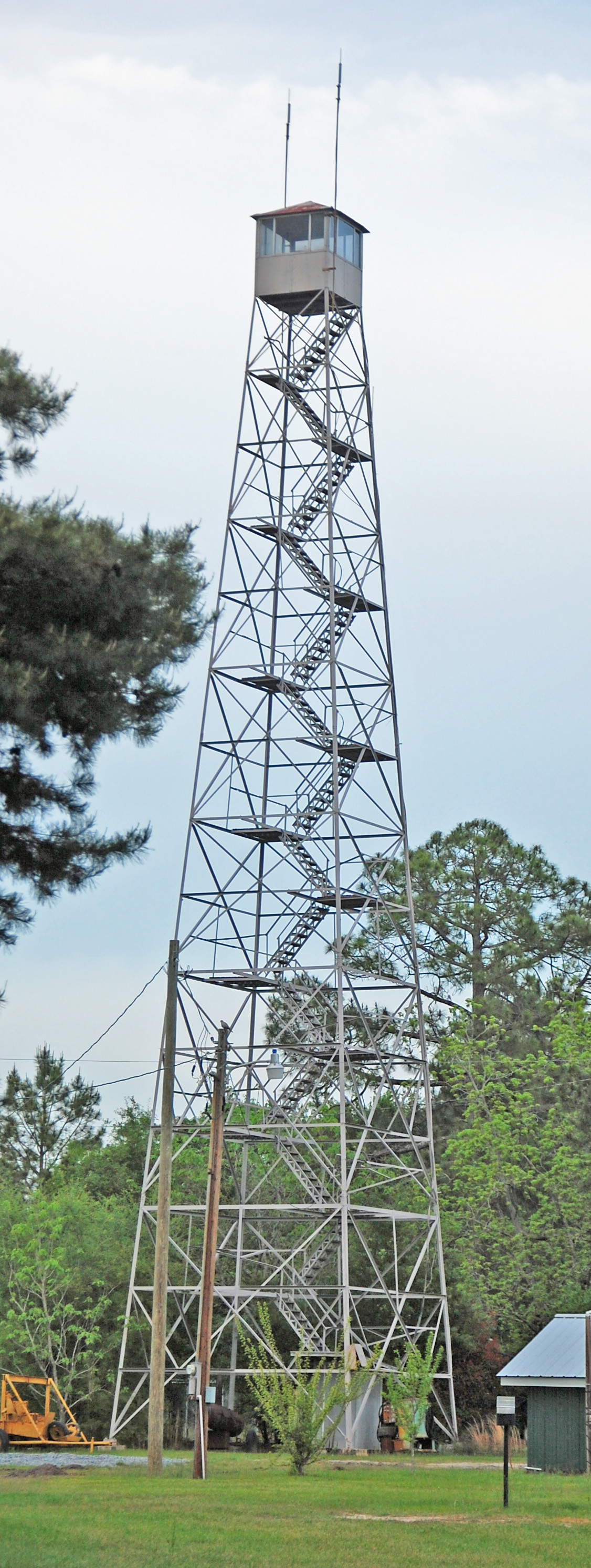
Fire lookout tower in south Georgia, United States

Fire lookout towers predates the United States Forest Service, founded in 1905. Many townships, private lumber companies, and state forestry organizations operated fire lookout towers on their own accord.

The Great Fire of 1910, also known as the Big Blowup, burned 3,000,000 acres (12,000 km^{2}) through the states of Washington, Idaho, and Montana. The smoke from this fire drifted across the country to Washington D.C. physically and politically. It caused the five-year-old Forest Service to address new policies regarding fire suppression. The fire created the modern system of fire rules, organizations, and policies.

To prevent and suppress fires, the U.S. Forest Service made another rule that townships, corporations and States would bear the cost of contracting fire suppression services.

As a result of the above rules, early fire detection and suppression became a priority. Towers began to be built across the country. While earlier lookouts used tall trees and high peaks with tents for shelters, by 1911 permanent cabins and cupolas were being constructed on mountaintops.

Beginning in 1910, the New Hampshire Timberlands Owners Association, a fire protection group, was formed and soon after, similar organizations were set up in Maine and Vermont. A leader of these efforts, W.R. Brown, an officer of the Brown Company which owned over 400,000 acres of timberland, set up a series of effective forest-fire lookout towers, possibly the first in the nation, and by 1917 helped establish a forest-fire insurance company.

In 1933, during the Great Depression, President Franklin Delano Roosevelt formed the Civilian Conservation Corps (CCC), consisting of young men and veterans of World War I. It was during this time that the CCC set about building fire lookout towers, and access roads to those towers. The U.S. Forest Service took great advantage of the CCC workforce and initiated a massive program of construction projects, including fire lookout towers. In California alone, some 250 lookout towers and cabs were built by CCC workers between 1933 and 1942.

The heyday of fire lookout towers was from 1930 through 1950. During World War II, the Aircraft Warning Service was established, operating from mid-1941 to mid-1944. Fire lookouts were assigned additional duty as Enemy Aircraft Spotters, especially on the West Coast of the United States.

From the 1960s through the 1990s the towers took a back seat to new technology, aircraft, and improvements in radios. The promise of space satellite fire detection and modern cell phones tried to compete with the remaining fire lookout towers, but in several environments, the technology failed.

Fires detected from space are already too large to make accurate assessments for control. Cell phones in wilderness areas still suffer from lack of signal. Today, some fire lookout towers remain in service, because having human eyes being able to detect smoke and call in the fire report allows fire management officials to decide early how the fire is to be managed. Fire lookout towers provide a reduction in time of fire detection to time of fire management assessment.

Idaho had the most known lookout sites (966); 196 of them still exist, with roughly 60 staffed each summer. Kansas is the only U.S. state that has never had a lookout.

A number of fire lookout tower stations, including many in New York State near the Adirondack Forest Preserve and Catskill Park, have been listed on the National Register of Historic Places.

=== Japan ===
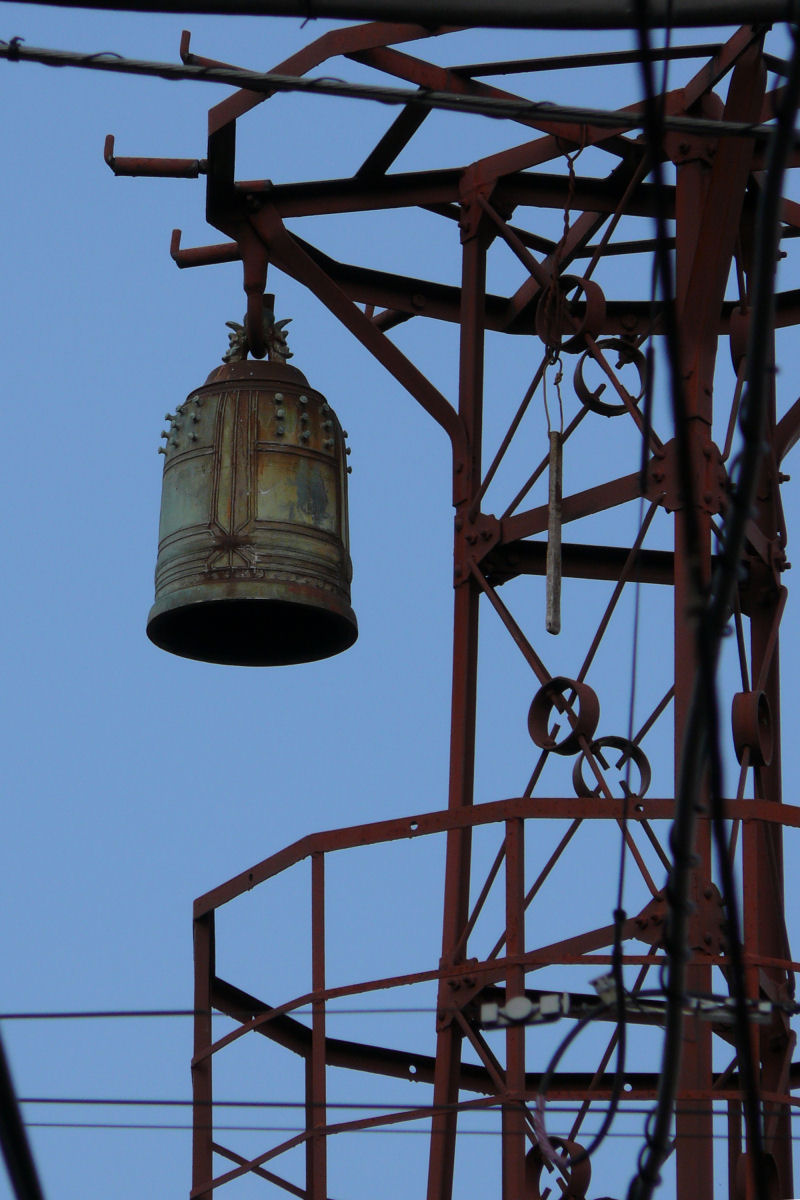
An alarm bell (半鐘, Hanshō) on top in Japan

During the Edo period in Japan fire lookout towers (火の見櫓, Hinomi-yagura) housed the fire fighting team of town (町火消, Machi-bi-keshi). Usually the fire lookout tower was built near a fire station (番屋, Ban-ya), and was equipped with a ladder, lookout platform, and an alarm bell (半鐘, Hanshō)(ja). From these towers watchmen could observe the entire town, and in the event of a fire they would ring the alarm bell, calling up firemen and warning town residents. In some towns the bells were also used to mark the time.

While the fire lookout towers remained fully equipped into the Shōwa period, they were later replaced by telephone and radio broadcasting systems in many cities.

=== Canada ===
Like the United States, fire towers were built across Canada to protect the valuable trees for the forestry industry. Most towers were built in the early 1920s to 1950s and were a mix of wood and steel structures. A total of 325 towers dotted the landscape of Ontario in the 1960s, and today approx. 156 towers span the province, but only a handful of towers remained in use after the 1970s. They are still in use in British Columbia, Alberta, Saskatchewan, Manitoba, Ontario and a few of the Maritime Provinces. Nova Scotia decommissioned the last of its 32 fire towers in 2015 and had them torn down by a contractor.

=== Germany ===
The first fire lookout tower was built to the plans of Forstmeister Walter Seitz between 1890 and 1900, located in the "Muskauer Forst" near Weißwasser. Warnings were transmitted by light signal. For transmission of location, Seitz divided the forest area into so-called "Jagen", numbered areas, with that number to be transmitted to the city. He received a patent for this system in 1902. Seitz traveled to the 1904 Louisiana Purchase Exposition for a presentation of his idea in the USA.

=== Russia ===
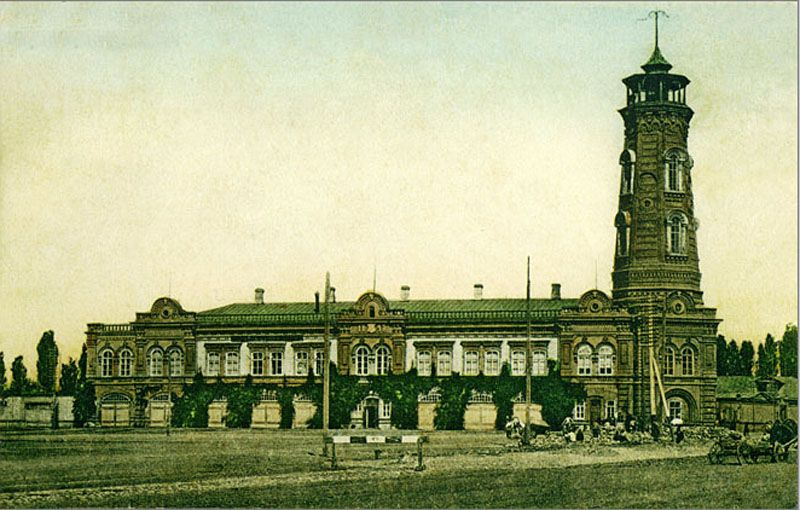
Fire station in Tsaritsin, c. 1900

As wood had been a key building material in Russia for centuries, urban fires were a constant threat to the towns and cities. To address that issue, in the early 19th century a program was launched to construct fire stations equipped with lookout towers called kalancha, overlooking mostly low-rise quarters. Watchmen standing vigil there could signal other stations as well as their own using simple signals. Surviving towers are often local landmarks.

== Today ==
=== Australia ===
Fire towers are still in use in Australia, particularly in the mountainous regions of the south-eastern states. Victoria's Forest Fire Management operates 72 towers across the state during the fire season with towers being constructed as recently as 2016. Jimna Fire Tower in Southeastern Queensland is the tallest fire tower in the country, at 47 meters above the ground, and is included on the state heritage register.

=== United States ===
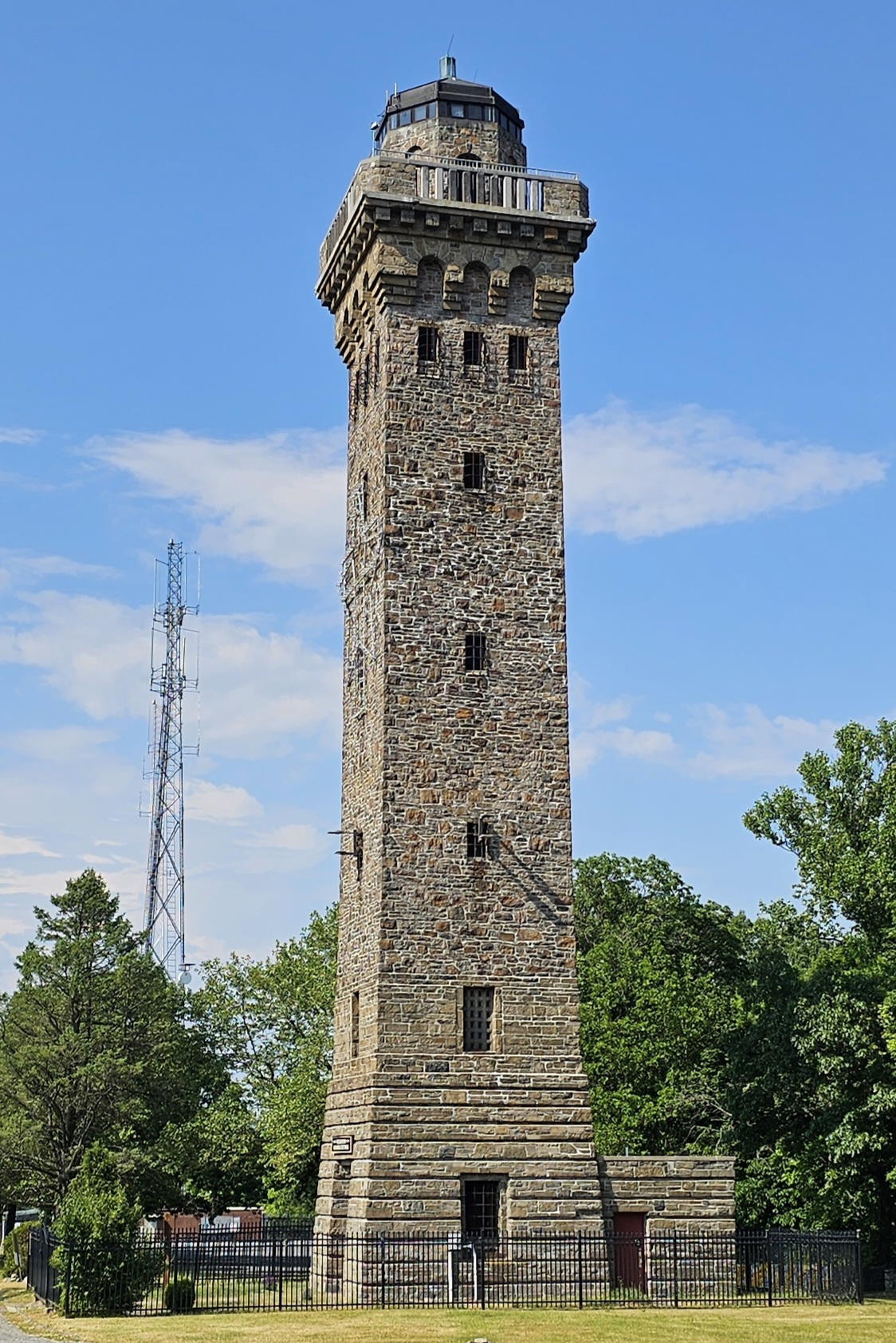
The William Penn Memorial Fire Tower overlooking Reading, Pennsylvania

Today, hundreds of towers are still in service with paid-staff and/or volunteer citizens. In some areas, the fire lookout operator often receives hundreds of forest visitors during a weekend and provides a needed “pre-fire suppression” message, supported by handouts from the "Smokey Bear", or "Woodsy Owl" education campaigns. This educational information is often distributed to young hikers that make their way up to the fire lookout tower. In this aspect, the towers are remote way stations and interpretive centers. The fire lookout tower also acts as a sentinel in the forest attracting lost or injured hikers, that make their way to the tower knowing they can get help.

Several organizations have been founded to save, rebuild, restore, and operate fire lookout towers.

=== Germany ===
Starting in 2002, traditional fire watch was replaced by "FireWatch", optical sensors located on old lookout towers or mobile phone masts. Based on a system developed by the DLR for analyzing gases and particles in space, a terrestrial version for forest fire smoke detection was developed by DLR and IQ Wireless. Currently, about 200 of these sensors are installed around Germany, while similar systems have been deployed in Mexico, Kazakhstan, the USA and other countries.

=== Canada ===
Several Canadian provinces have fire lookout towers. Dorset, Ontario's Scenic Tower was built on the site of former fire lookout tower (1922-1962).

== Types ==
=== Wooden towers ===
Many fire lookout towers are simply cabs that have been fitted to large railroad water tank towers. One of the last wooden fire lookout towers in Southern California was the South Mount Hawkins Fire Lookout, in the Angeles National Forest. A civilian effort is underway to rebuild the tower after its loss in the Curve Fire of September 2002.

=== Steel towers ===
Steel towers can vary in size and height.

The Aermotor Company, originally of Chicago, Illinois, was the first and lead manufacturer of steel fire towers from the 1910s to the mid-1920s. These towers have very small cabs, as the towers are based on Aermotor windmill towers. These towers are often found in the U.S. Midwest and South, but a few are in the mountainous West. In the northeast, all of the towers in the Adirondack Mountains and most in the Catskills were Aermotor towers erected between 1916 and 1921.

The typical cab of an Aermoter had a 7 by 7 feet (2.1 by 2.1 m) cab with a fire locating device mounted in the center. Access was by way of a trap door in the floor.

=== Ground cabs ===
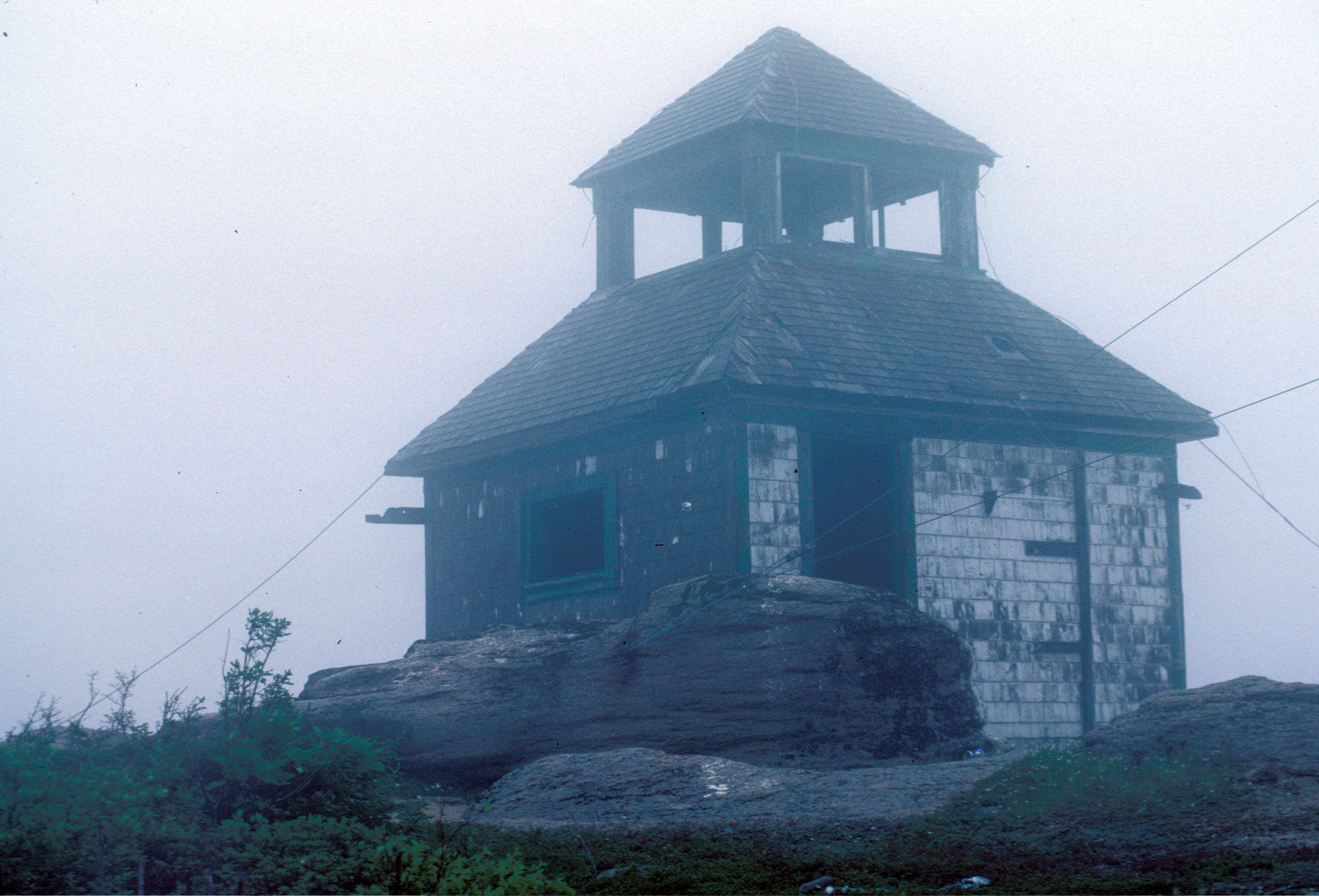
Abandoned fire-spotting hut on Big Bald Mountain (New Brunswick), Canada (IR Walker 1986)

Ground cabs are still known as "towers" even though there may be no such tower under the cab. These towers can be one, two or three stories tall with foundations made of natural stone or concrete. These towers vary greatly in size, but many are simple wooden or steel tower cabs that were constructed using the same plans, sans the tower.

=== Lookout trees ===
The simplest kind consist of a ladder to a suitable height. Such trees could have platforms on the ground next to them for maps and a fire finder. A more elaborate version, such as the Gloucester tree in Australia, added a permanent platform to the tree by building a wooden or, later, metal structure at the top of the tree, with metal spikes hammered into the trunk to form a spiral ladder. These 'platform trees' were often equipped with telephones, fire finder tables, seats and guy-wires.

== Records ==
- Tallest lookout tower in the world: Warren Bicentennial Tree Lookout, Western Australia — 225.7 feet (68.8 m).
- Tallest all-steel lookout tower in the world: Beard Tower, 5 km (3.1 mi) SE of Manjimup, Western Australia — 200 feet (61 m).
- Tallest lookout tower in the U.S.: Woodworth Tower, Alexandria, Louisiana — 175 feet (53 m).
- Highest lookout site in the world: Fairview Peak Lookout, Colorado — 13,214 feet (4,028 m).
- Lowest lookout sites in the world: Pine Island L.O., Florida & Evans Pines L.O., Florida — 2 feet (0.61 m).

== Countries continuing to use fire lookout towers ==
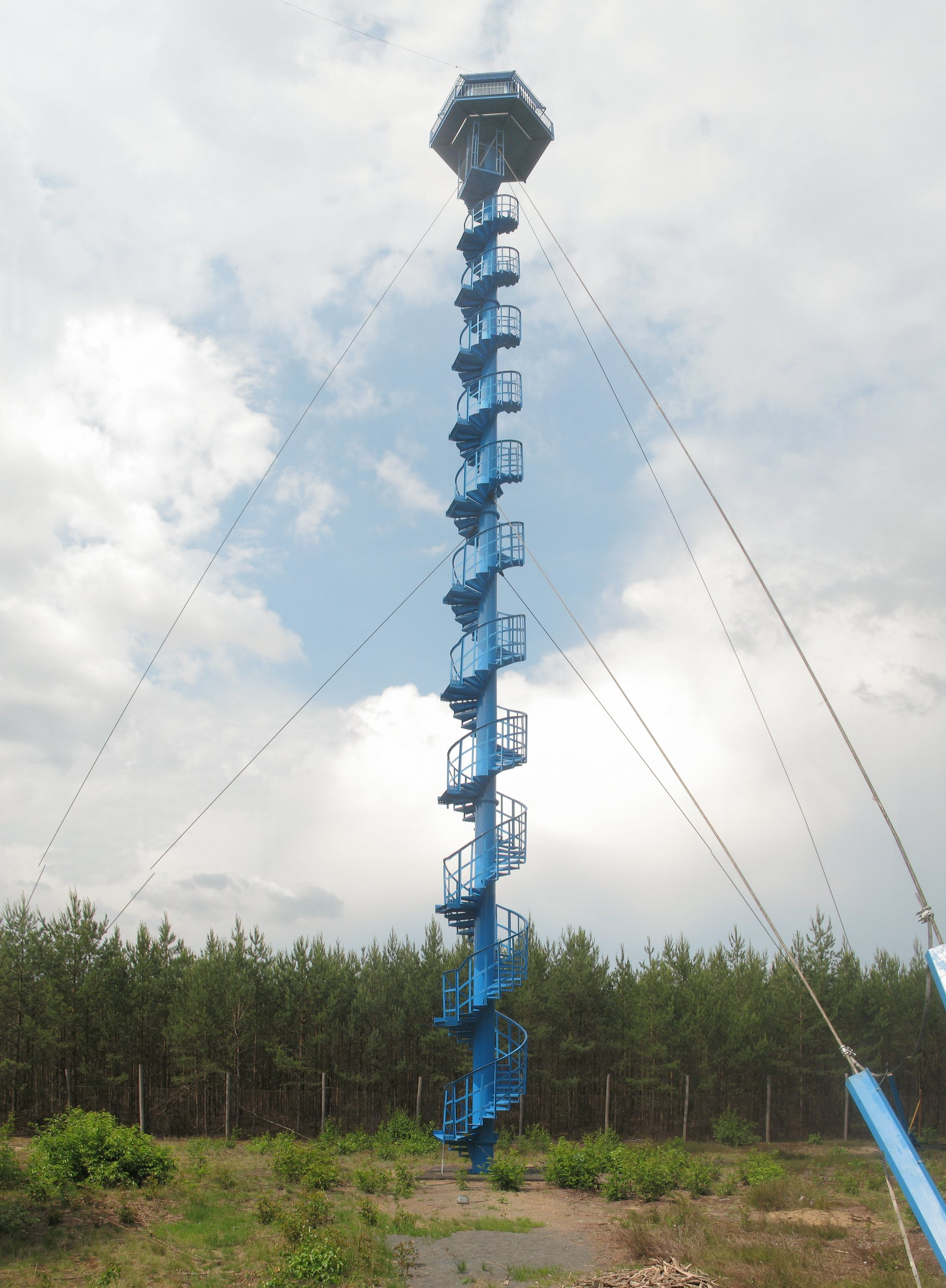
A fire tower in Poland

- Australia
- Belgium
- Brazil
- Canada (Alberta, B.C., Manitoba, Nova Scotia, Ontario, Saskatchewan)
- France
- Germany
- Greece
- Indonesia
- Israel
- Italy
- Latvia
- Mexico
- New Zealand
- Norway
- Poland
- Portugal
- South Africa
- Spain
- Turkey
- United States
- Uruguay

== See also ==
- List of fire lookout towers
- Lookout tree
- Watchtower
- Drill tower, used in firefighting practice
- Hose tower, used in some fire stations to dry firehoses
- Fire control tower, used to control gun fire from coastal batteries
- List of New Jersey Forest Fire Service fire towers
- Firewatch, a video game centered around a fire lookout tower in Shoshone National Forest
