= Bellvale Sandstone =

Geologic formation in New Jersey and New York, United States

- Stratigraphic range: Middle Devonian
- Type: Geological formation
- Underlies: Skunnemunk Conglomerate
- Overlies: Cornwall Shale

Location
- Extent: New Jersey, New York

The Bellvale Sandstone is a geologic formation in New Jersey and New York. It preserves fossils dating back to the Devonian period.

== See also ==
- List of fossiliferous stratigraphic units in New York
