= Tincup, Colorado =

Unincorporated community in Gunnison County, CO, USA

Tincup, Colorado Tin Cup, Colorado
- Unincorporated community
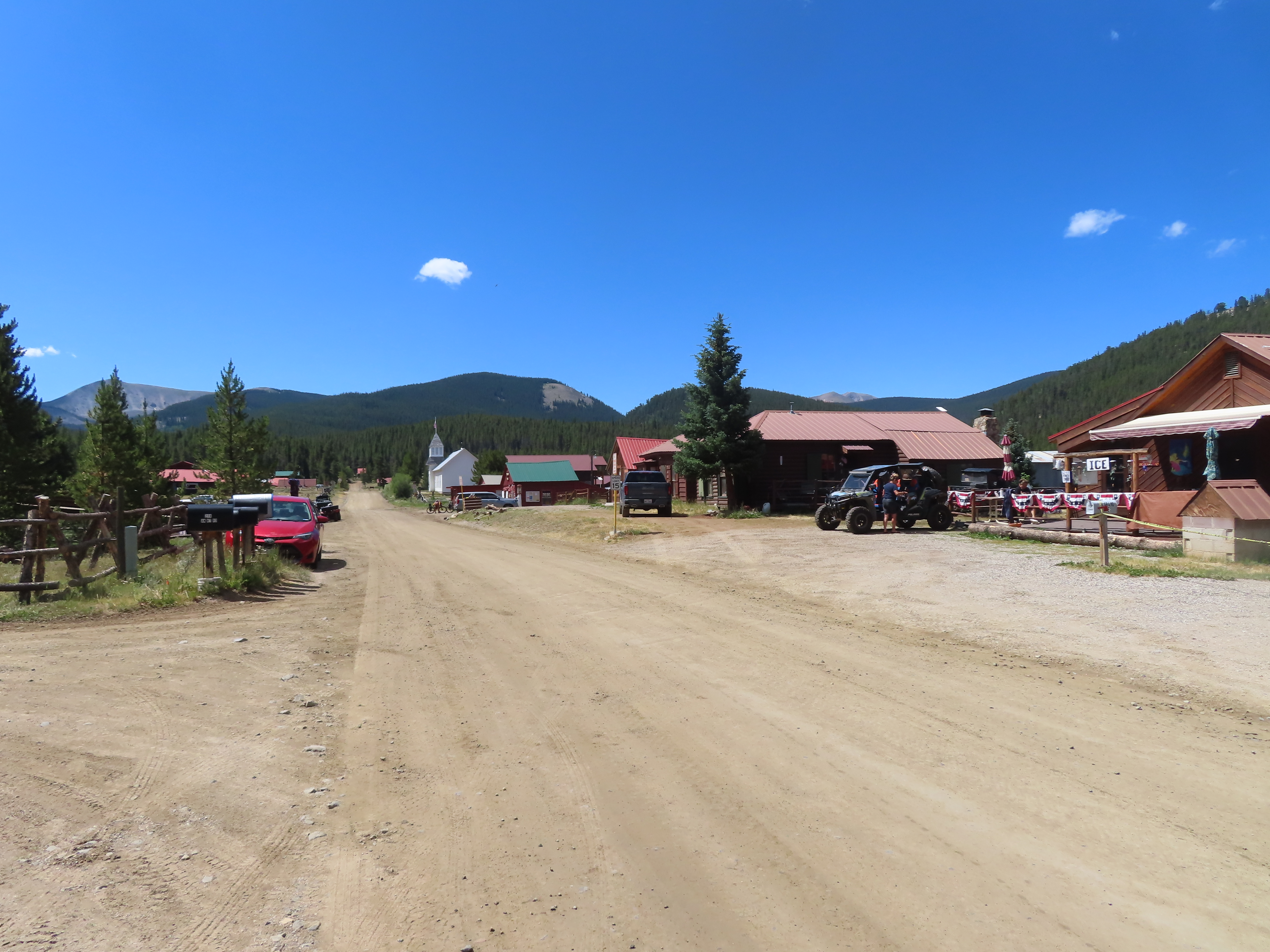
- Tincup

- Location within Colorado Location within the United States
- Coordinates: 38°45′16″N 106°28′42″W
- Country: United States
- State: Colorado
- County: Gunnison
- Elevation: 10,158 ft (3,096 m)
- Time zone: UTC-7 (MST)
  - Summer (DST): UTC-6 (MDT)
- ZIP code: 81210
- GNIS feature ID: 189089

Tincup, or Tin Cup, originally named Virginia City, is an unincorporated community in Gunnison County, Colorado, United States. The community was once a prominent mining town.

A post office named Virginia, Colorado opened on July 22, 1879. The name was changed to Tin Cup on February 28, 1880, and finally changed to Tincup on May 7, 1895. The Tincup post office closed on January 31, 1918.

== History ==
In October 1859, prospector Jim Taylor panned some gold from Willow Creek, and carried it back to camp in a tin cup; he named the valley “Tin Cup Gulch.” For years the area was the site of seasonal placer mining, but no year-round communities were established, partly because of the danger of Native American hostilities.

In 1878, lode deposits were discovered in the area, and the town of Virginia City was laid out in March 1879. By the 1880 census, the town had a population of 1,495. As Virginia City, it was incorporated in August 1880, but confusion with Virginia City, Nevada, and Virginia City, Montana, caused the residents to change the name. The town was reincorporated in July 1882 as Tin Cup.

Early Tin Cup was a violent place. Town marshal Harry Rivers died in a gunfight in 1882, and marshal Andy Jameson was shot to death in 1883.

The town population declined when the mines were exhausted. The post office closed in 1918, and the last town election was held in 1918.

The Boothill Cemetery is located just south of the town.

The Great Divide passes through Tincup, creating Tincup Pass.

== See also ==
- List of ghost towns in Colorado
- Cumberland Pass
- Blistered Horn Mill, Colorado
