= Cumberland Pass =

Mountain pass in Colorado, USA

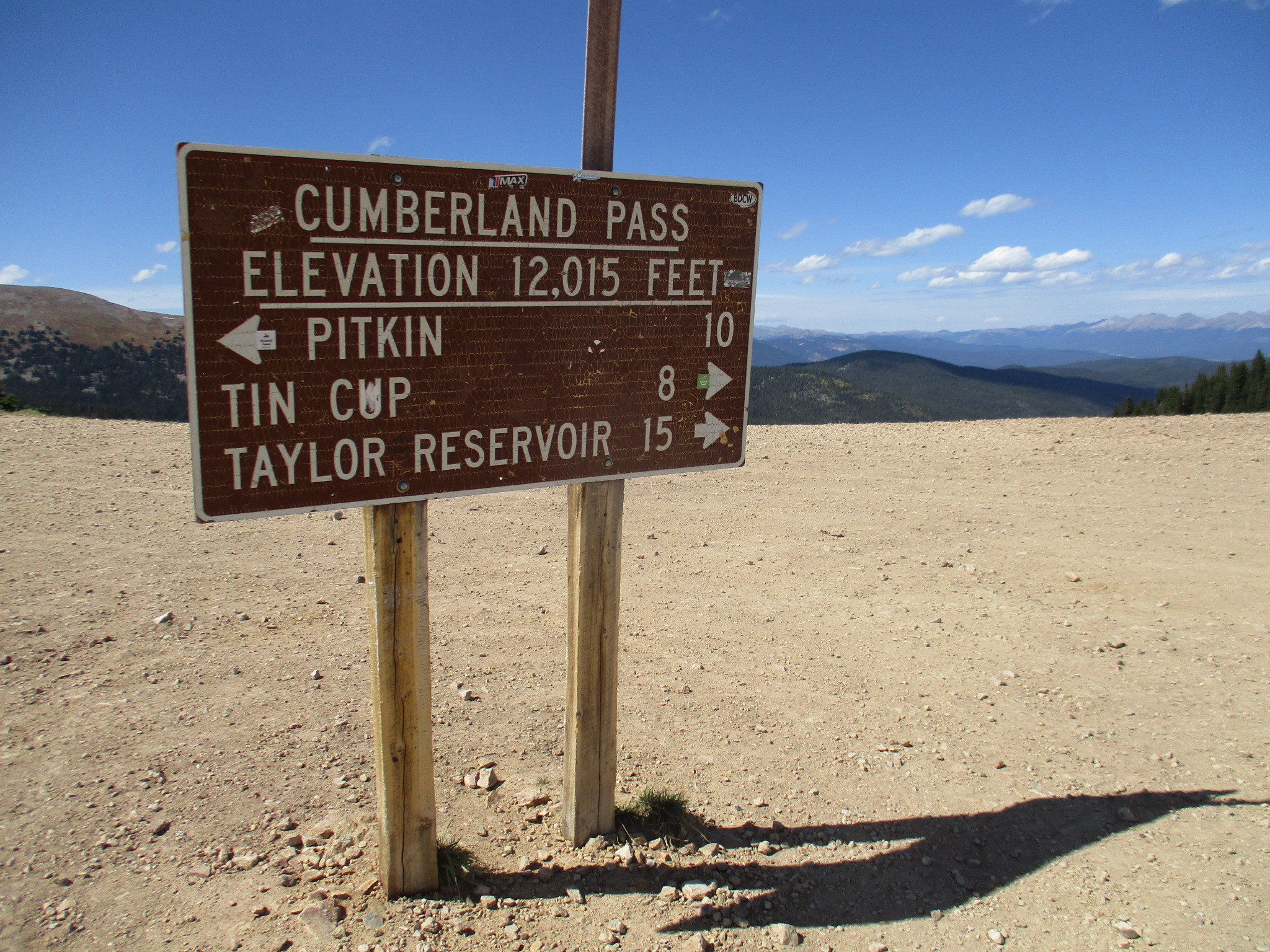
- Sign marking Cumberland Pass.
- Interactive map of Cumberland Pass
- Elevation: 12,034 feet (3,668 m)
- Traversed by: Forest Road 765

Third Approach
- Location: Gunnison County, Colorado, U.S.
- Range: Sawatch Range
- Coordinates: 38°41′20.98″N 106°29′3.1″W
- Topo map: Cumberland Pass

Cumberland Pass (elevation 12,034 feet (3,668 m)) is a high mountain pass in the Sawatch Range of the Rocky Mountains of Colorado. It is located in Gunnison County and in the Gunnison National Forest. The pass divides the watersheds of West Willow Creek to the north and Quartz Creek to the south.

The pass is traversed by Forest Road 765 and can be accessed from the towns of Tincup to the north and Pitkin to the south. The road is gravel and is closed seasonally due to heavy snowfall, typically from November until May.

The Cumberland Pass road was built in 1882, connecting the mining towns of Tin Cup to the north and Pitkin to the south. The wagon road allowed ore from Tincup-area mines to be shipped to the Quartz Station of the Denver & South Park Railroad. The ore was then shipped by rail east through the Alpine Tunnel. The road was later improved by the Civilian Conservation Corps in 1935 and improved again in the 1950s.

Evidence of past and present human activities can be found at Cumberland Pass. Mining prospects and abandoned mines dot the landscape and a network of dirt roads and trails are popular with motorcycle, ATV, and four-wheel-drive vehicle users.
