= Henry Art Gallery =

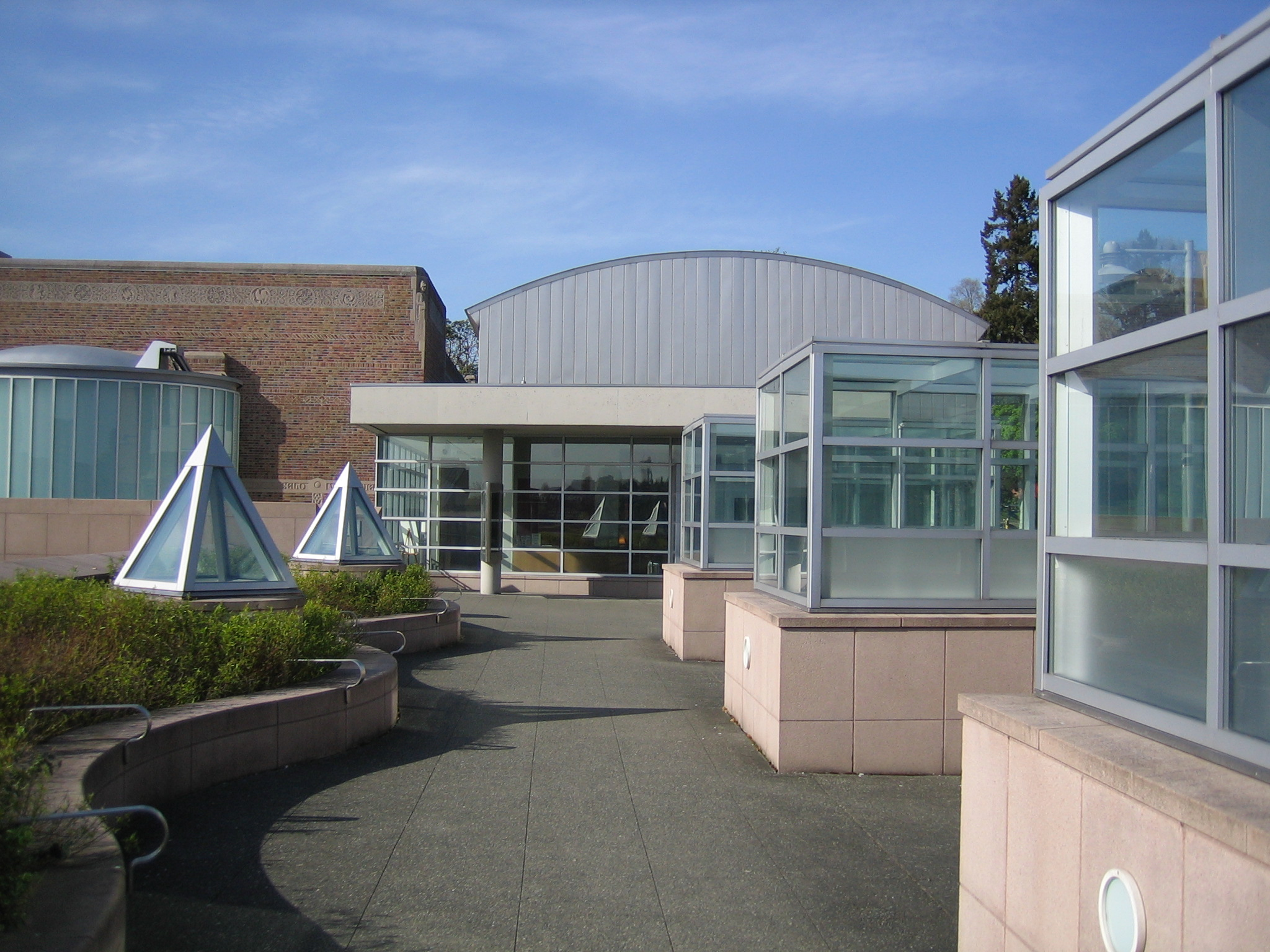
- Henry Art Gallery main entrance
- Established: 10 February 1927
- Location: University of Washington campus Seattle, Washington
- Coordinates: 47.6564°N 122.3117°W
- Type: Art museum
- Accreditation: American Alliance of Museums
- Key holdings: James Turrell Skyspace: Light Reign
- Collections: Contemporary art, Photography
- Collection size: 28,000
- Founder: Horace Chapin Henry
- Directors: Kris Lewis, John S. Behnke Director
- Architects: Bebb and Gould (original); Gwathmey Siegel & Associates Architects (expansion)
- Owner: University of Washington College of Arts and Sciences
- Public transit access: 1 Line (Sound Transit), University of Washington station
- Website: henryart.org

The Henry Art Gallery ("The Henry") is the contemporary art museum of the University of Washington in Seattle, Washington. It is administered by the Arts Division of the College of Arts and Sciences of the University of Washington.

Located on the west edge of the university's campus along 15th Avenue N.E. in the University District, it was founded in February, 1927, and was the first public art museum in the state of Washington. The original building was designed by Bebb and Gould. It was expanded in 1997 to 40,000 square feet (3,700 m^{2}), at which time the 154-seat auditorium was added. The addition/expansion was designed by Gwathmey Siegel & Associates Architects.

== Founder ==
The museum was named for Horace C. Henry, the local businessman who donated money for its founding, as well as a collection of paintings he had begun collecting in the 1890s after visiting the Chicago World's Fair. Henry donated the collection he built with his late wife Susan of 178 works of art, along with funds for construction, and the Henry Art Gallery opened to the public on February 10, 1927. Some years prior, Henry had added gallery space to his own home on Capitol Hill, and from 1917 until the foundation of the Henry Gallery, he effectively operated a wing of his home as a free museum, open to the public 10 hours a week. In contrast to Charles and Emma Frye of Seattle's Frye Art Museum, Henry made no effort to control the future of the museum he financed; indeed, he specifically disavowed any such intention.

== Exhibitions ==
The Henry's exhibition program is largely devoted to contemporary art and the history of photography. Major exhibitions have included Ann Hamilton: the common S E N S E (Oct 2014), Katinka Bock: A and I (2013), Maya Lin (2006), Lynn Hershman Leeson (2005–06), Doug Aitken (2005), James Turrell (2003), and group exhibitions such as W.O.W. - The Work of the Work, 2004–05, which explored contemporary art's appeal to non-visual senses and the body of the viewer.

== Collection ==
The Henry's collection includes over 28,000 objects. The collection includes holdings in photography, both historical and contemporary, due to the partial gift and purchase of the Joseph and Elaine Monsen collection. In 1982, the Henry inherited a sizable collection from the University of Washington's former Costume and Textile Study Center. The Henry also holds a James Turrell Skyspace, Light Reign, a site-specific immersive sculpture finished in 2003. Like the Seattle baseball stadium, the Skyspace has a retractable roof.

The Henry has made their collections available for research and general public interest by providing in-house and online public access though the Eleanor Henry Reed Collection Study Center and the online collections database. These resources allow students and the general public to explore collections for personal or professional research. Objects in the collection can be accessed on-site, by reservation only, through the Reed Collection Study Center or academic classes, adult study groups, and researchers.

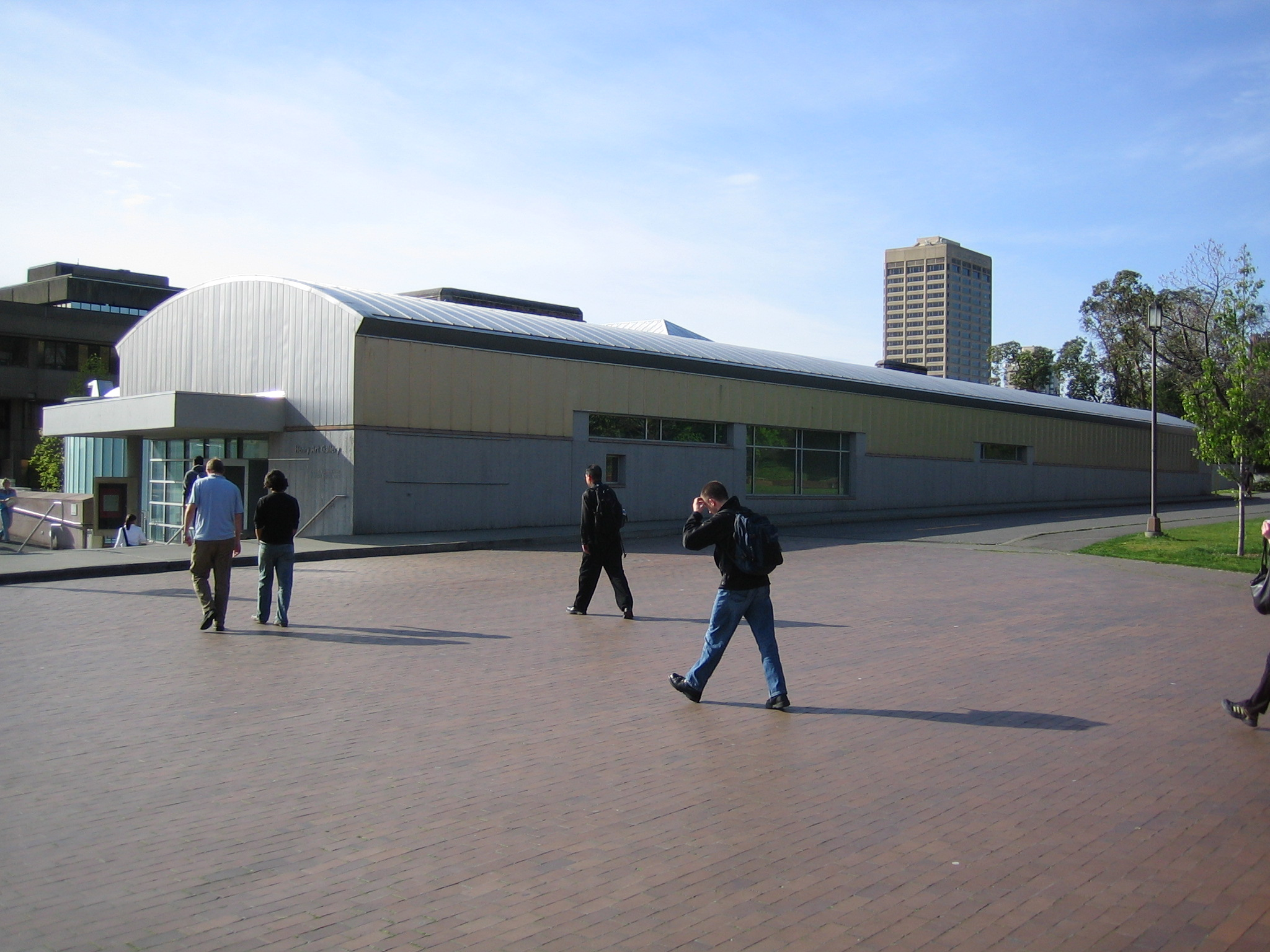
Perspectival view of Henry Art Gallery

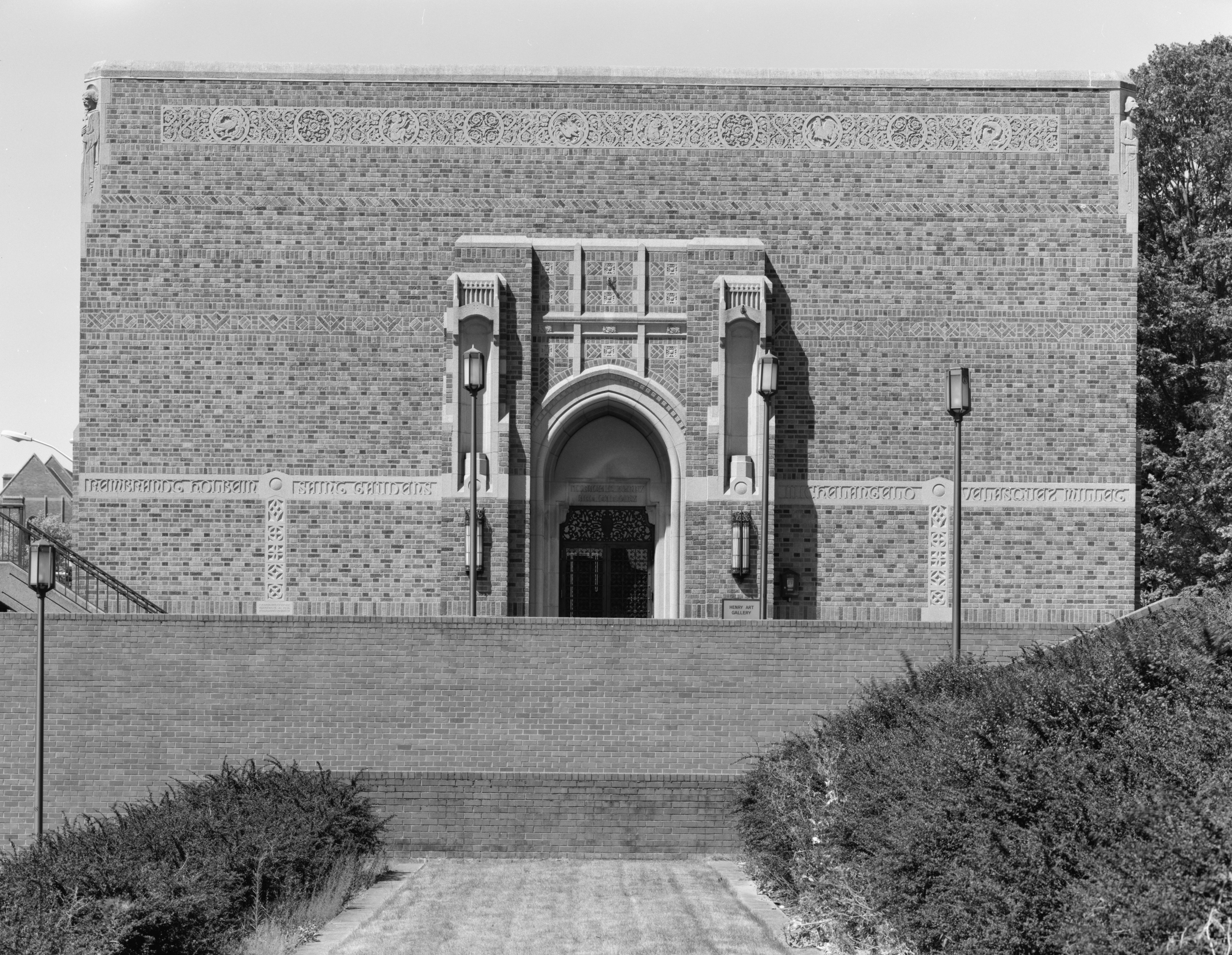
South elevation view as designed by Bebb and Gould, prior to additions by Gwathmey Siegel

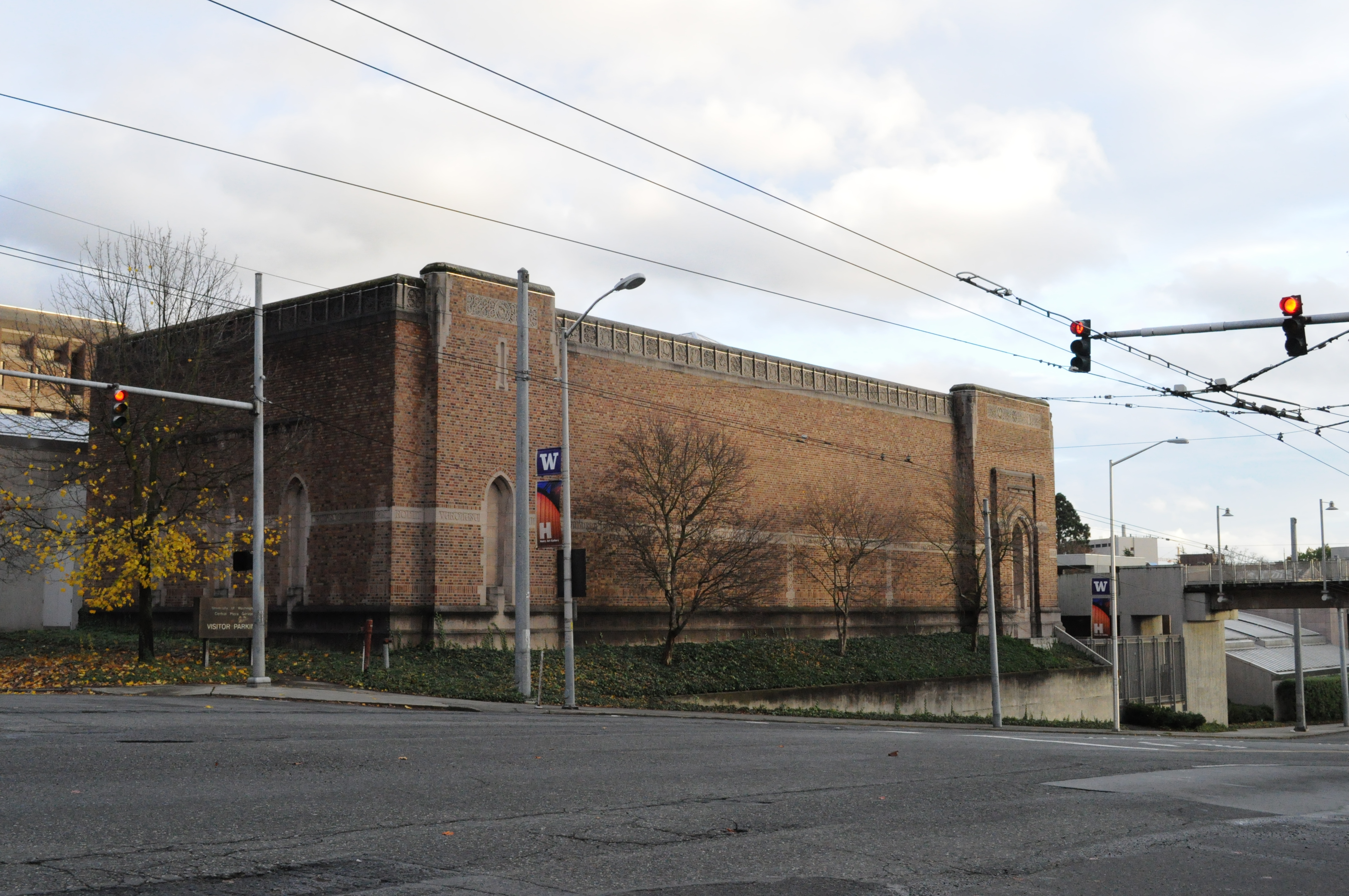
Henry Art Gallery facing 15th Ave

== Brink Award ==
The Brink Award was a biennial art award for an emerging artist from Washington, Oregon, or British Columbia worth $12,500. The award was established in 2008 and is administered by the Henry Art Gallery.

=== Past award winners ===
- Isabelle Pauwels (2009)
- Andrew Dadson (2011)
- Anne Fenton (2013)
- Jason Hirata (2015)
- Demian DinéYazhi' (2017)
