= Fairmont Olympic Hotel =

Historic high-rise hotel in Seattle, Washington, United States

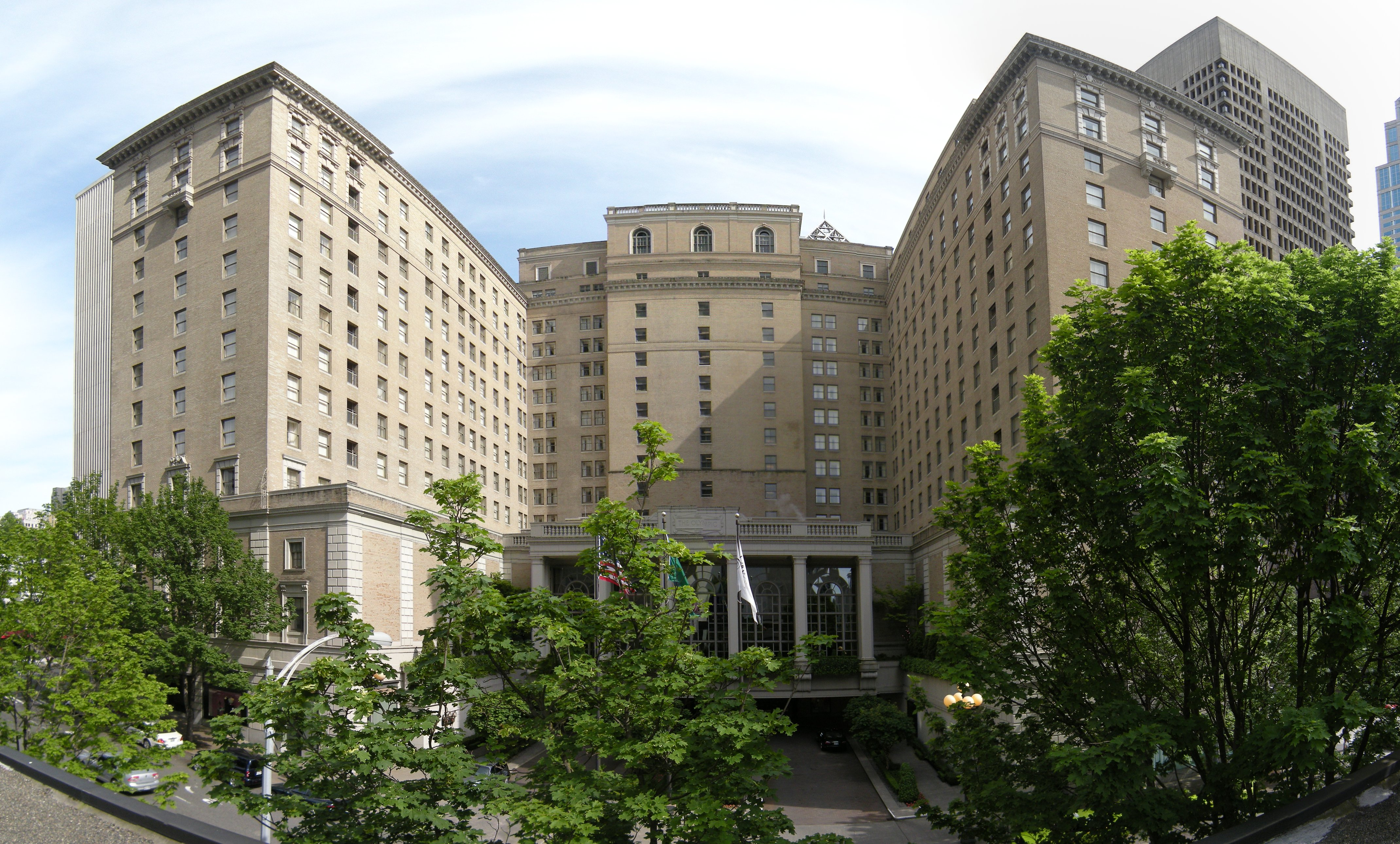
- Fairmont Olympic Hotel Seattle

- Location within Downtown Seattle
- Hotel chain: Fairmont Hotels and Resorts

General information
- Location: 411 University Street; Seattle, Washington, U.S.
- Coordinates: 47.608011°N 122.334548°W
- Opening: December 6, 1924
- Owner: Trinity Investments
- Operator: Accor Hotels

Height
- Height: 168 feet (51 m)

Technical details
- Floor count: 14

Design and construction
- Architect: George B. Post & Son

Other information
- Number of rooms: 450
- Number of restaurants: 3

Website
- www.fairmont.com/seattle
- Olympic Hotel
- U.S. National Register of Historic Places
- Architectural style: Italian Renaissance
- NRHP reference No.: 79002538
- Added to NRHP: June 15, 1979

The Fairmont Olympic Hotel, originally The Olympic Hotel, is a luxury hotel in downtown Seattle, Washington. A historic landmark, the hotel was built on the original site of the University of Washington's campus. The hotel opened in 1924, and in 1979, it was added to the National Register of Historic Places. The hotel was inducted into Historic Hotels of America, the official program of the National Trust for Historic Preservation, in 2018.

== History ==
After World War I, Seattle's Chamber of Commerce appointed a committee to work toward the goal of bringing a world-class hotel to the city. The committee identified an undeveloped portion of the city's Metropolitan Tract, a downtown area covering four blocks, as an ideal location for a new hotel. The Tract was also known as Denny's Knoll, after Arthur A. Denny, one of Seattle's founders, who had donated the land for the Territorial University, which would later become the University of Washington.

The university had relocated to a campus north of Portage Bay in 1895, but still owned the downtown tract of land. The university's Board of Regents leased the land to the Metropolitan Building Company in 1904, with the agreement that it would be developed in trust for the university for the next 50 years.

The Seattle Times held a contest to name the hotel. From 3,906 entries, the committee chose The Olympic.

Local business leaders established the Community Hotel Corporation to finance the hotel project. In 1922, once the lease had gone into effect, the Community Hotel Corporation chose New York architect George B. Post & Son to design the building; the local firm Bebb and Gould—a partnership between Charles Bebb and Carl Gould—were hired as the local supervising architects. Post created an Italian Renaissance design that was popular at the time, and this design remains one of the building's hallmarks today.

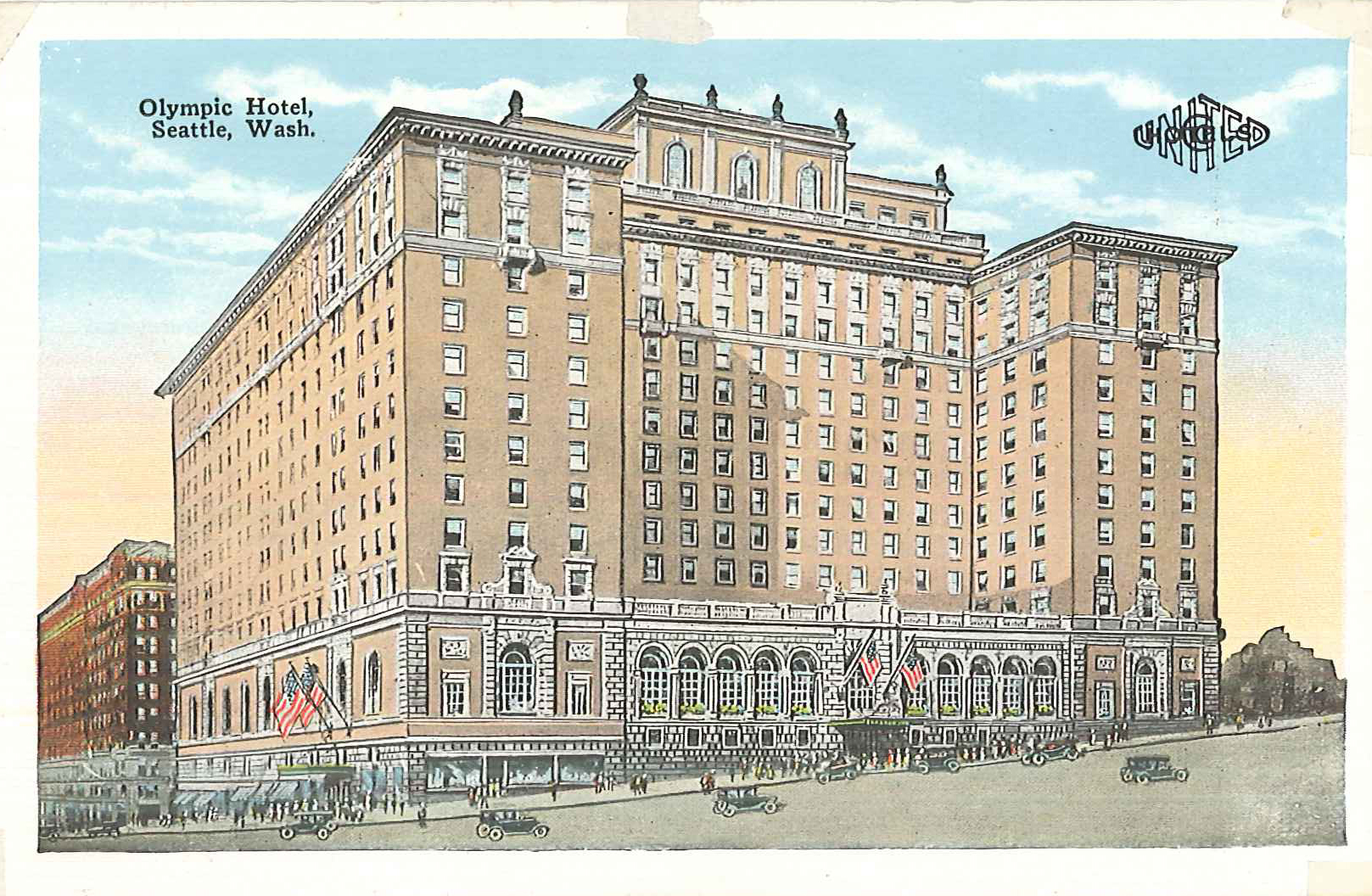
Olympic Hotel, circa 1925

Builders broke ground on April 1, 1923, and construction began. The steel frame was started in January 1924, and by November, the building was completed. The total cost for construction was $5.5 million, with $800,000 going to furnishings alone. The hotel was operated by Niagara Falls businessman Frank A. Dudley and the United Hotels Company.

The Olympic Hotel's grand opening took place on December 6, 1924, with a grand dinner and dance attended by more than 2,000 Seattle residents and their guests. Hundreds more people lined the streets just to catch a glimpse of the new hotel.

In 1953, the University of Washington's Board of Regents extended the hotel's lease. At the same time, they approved a plan to demolish the Metropolitan Theatre, around which The Olympic Hotel had been built. The theatre had been a Seattle institution since it opened on October 2, 1911. The theatre's last night was December 4, 1954, hosting a performance of What Every Woman Knows starring Helen Hayes. The theatre was torn down, and a new drive-in motor entrance to the hotel was built in its place.

On August 1, 1955, Western Hotels assumed management of The Olympic Hotel. Western, renamed Western International in 1963, operated the Olympic until September 1, 1980, when the hotel was taken over by Four Seasons Hotels and Resorts. By that time, the hotel had been added to the National Register of Historic Places, to help ensure the preservation of the aging hotel's historic architecture.

Four Seasons undertook a $60 million renovation, which included the conversion of more than 750 small guest rooms into 450 updated units. The hotel reopened to guests on May 23, 1982, as the Four Seasons Olympic Hotel, with a grand re-opening celebration held on July 10, 1982.

In the mid-1990s, the University of Washington sold a 64 percent stake in the hotel to Chicago-based real-estate investment firm JMB Realty. In 2003, UW and JMB sold the Olympic to Legacy Hotels, which turned management of the property over to Fairmont Hotels & Resorts. The hotel was renamed The Fairmont Olympic Hotel on July 31, 2003.

The hotel was renovated at a cost of $25 million from 2020 to 2022. It was sold in December 2024 to Los Angeles-based Trinity Investments.
