= Bebb and Gould =

American architectural partnership

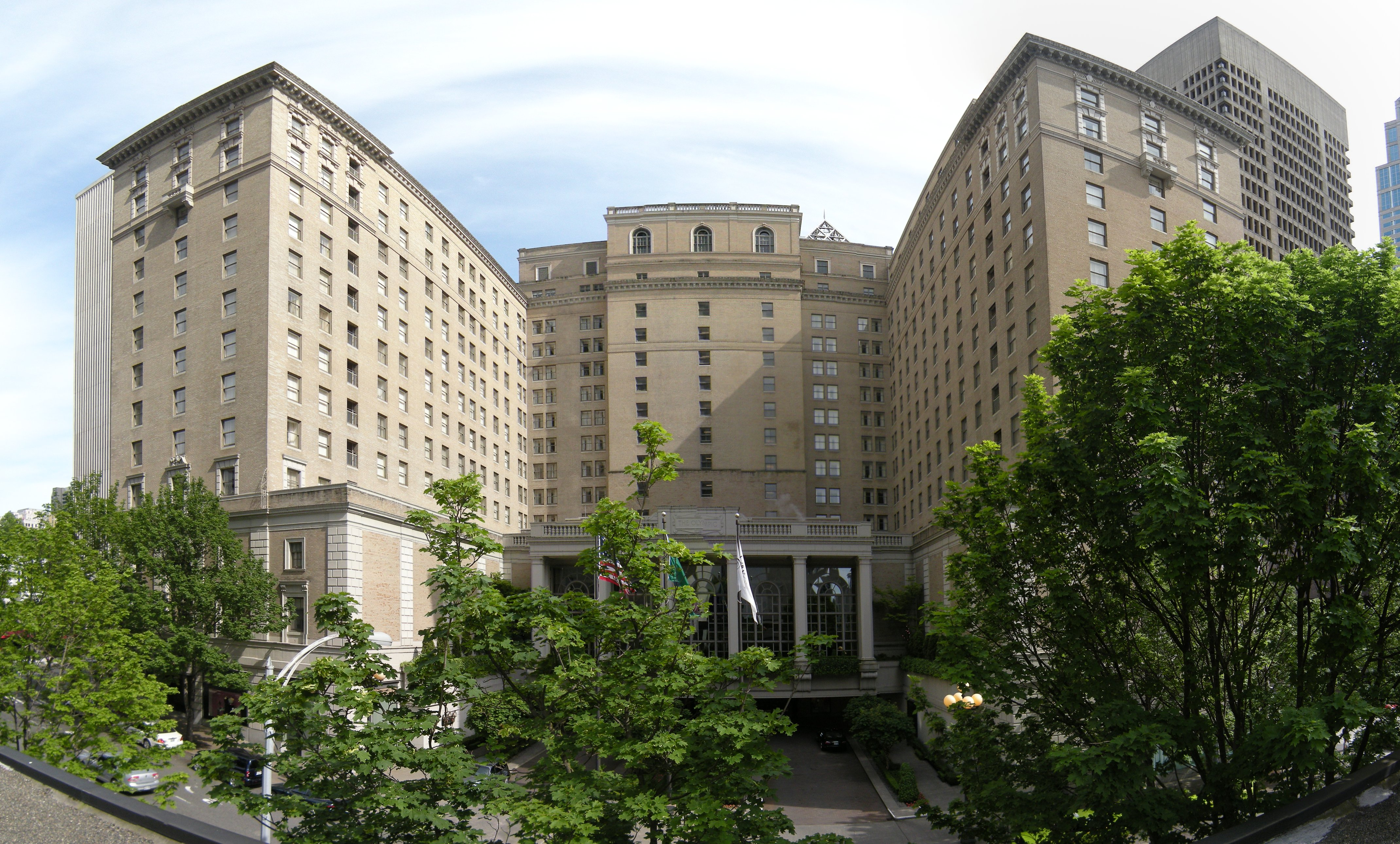
Olympic Hotel in Seattle

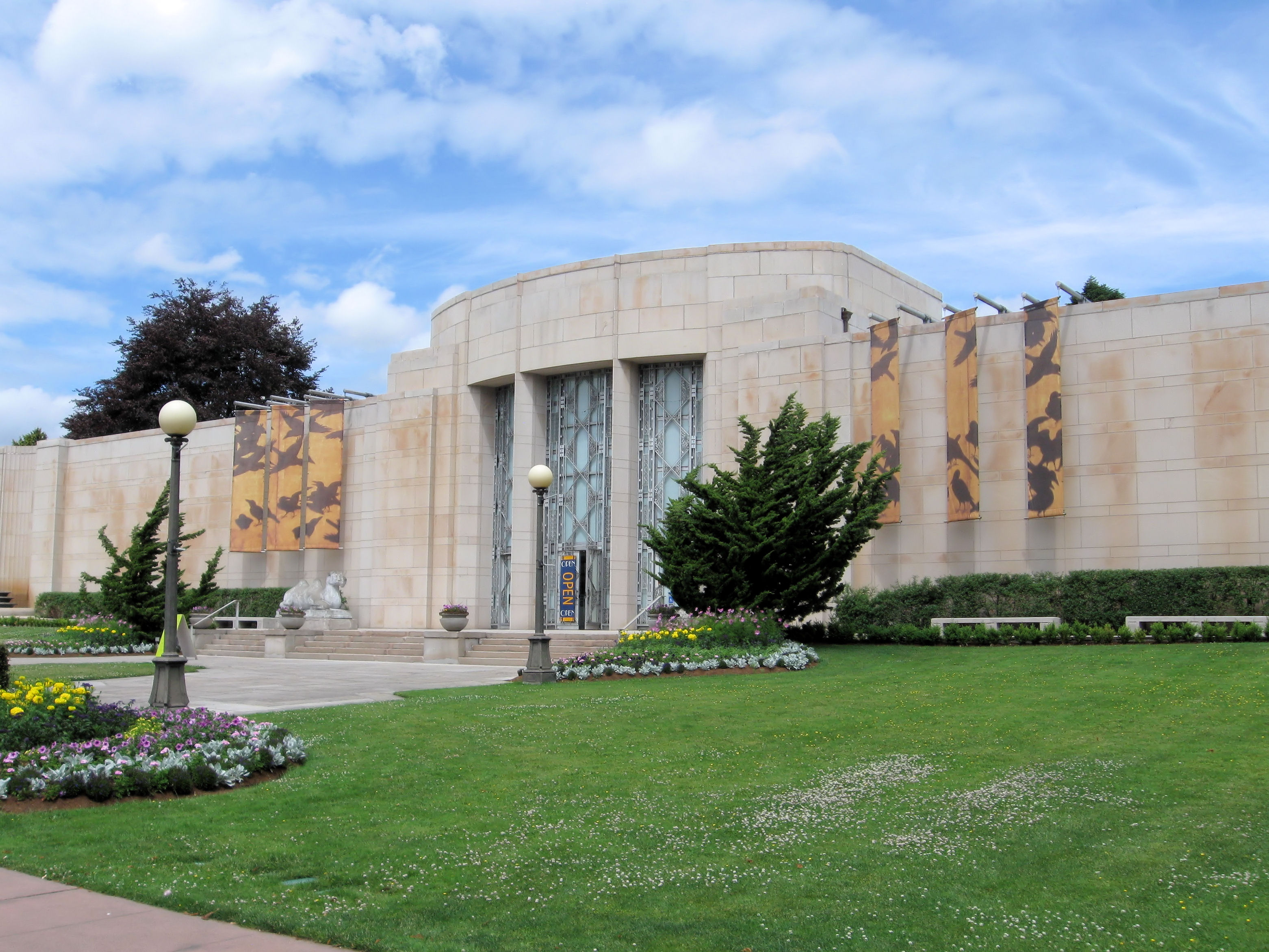
Seattle Asian Art Museum (originally Seattle Art Museum) in Volunteer Park

Bebb and Gould was an American architectural partnership active in Seattle, Washington from 1914 to 1939. Partners Charles Herbert Bebb and Carl Freylinghausen Gould were jointly responsible for the construction of many buildings on the University of Washington's Seattle campus, as well as the Seattle Times Square Building (1914), Everett Public Library, U.S. Marine Hospital (1930–32, now known as Pacific Tower and converted to mixed use), and the Seattle Art Museum building in Volunteer Park (1931–33, now known as the Seattle Asian Art Museum).

Several of their buildings are listed on the U.S. National Register of Historic Places.

Works (with attribution) include:

- Olympic Hotel, 1200–1220 4th Ave., Seattle (Bebb & Gould), NRHP-listed
- Green Lake Masonic Lodge (1921-24), 307 NE Maple Leaf PL NE, Green Lake, Seattle (Bebb & Gould)
- Larrabee House, 405 Fieldstone Rd., Bellingham, Washington (Bebb & Gould), NRHP-listed
- Pacific Telephone and Telegraph Building, 1304 Vandercook Way, Longview, Washington (Bebb & Gould), NRHP-listed
- Times Building, 414 Olive Way, Seattle (Bebb & Gould), NRHP-listed
- U.S. Marine Hospital, 1131 14th Ave., S., Seattle (Bebb & Gould), NRHP-listed
- Volunteer Park, Between E. Prospect and E. Galer Sts., and Federal and E. 15th Aves., Seattle (Bebb & Gould), NRHP-listed
- One or more works in the Centralia Downtown Historic District, roughly bounded by Center St., Burlington Northern right-of-way, Walnut St., and Pearl St., Centralia, Washington (Bebb and Gould), NRHP-listed
