= Times Square Building =

Building in Seattle, Washington, U.S.

- Times Building
- U.S. National Register of Historic Places
- Seattle Landmark
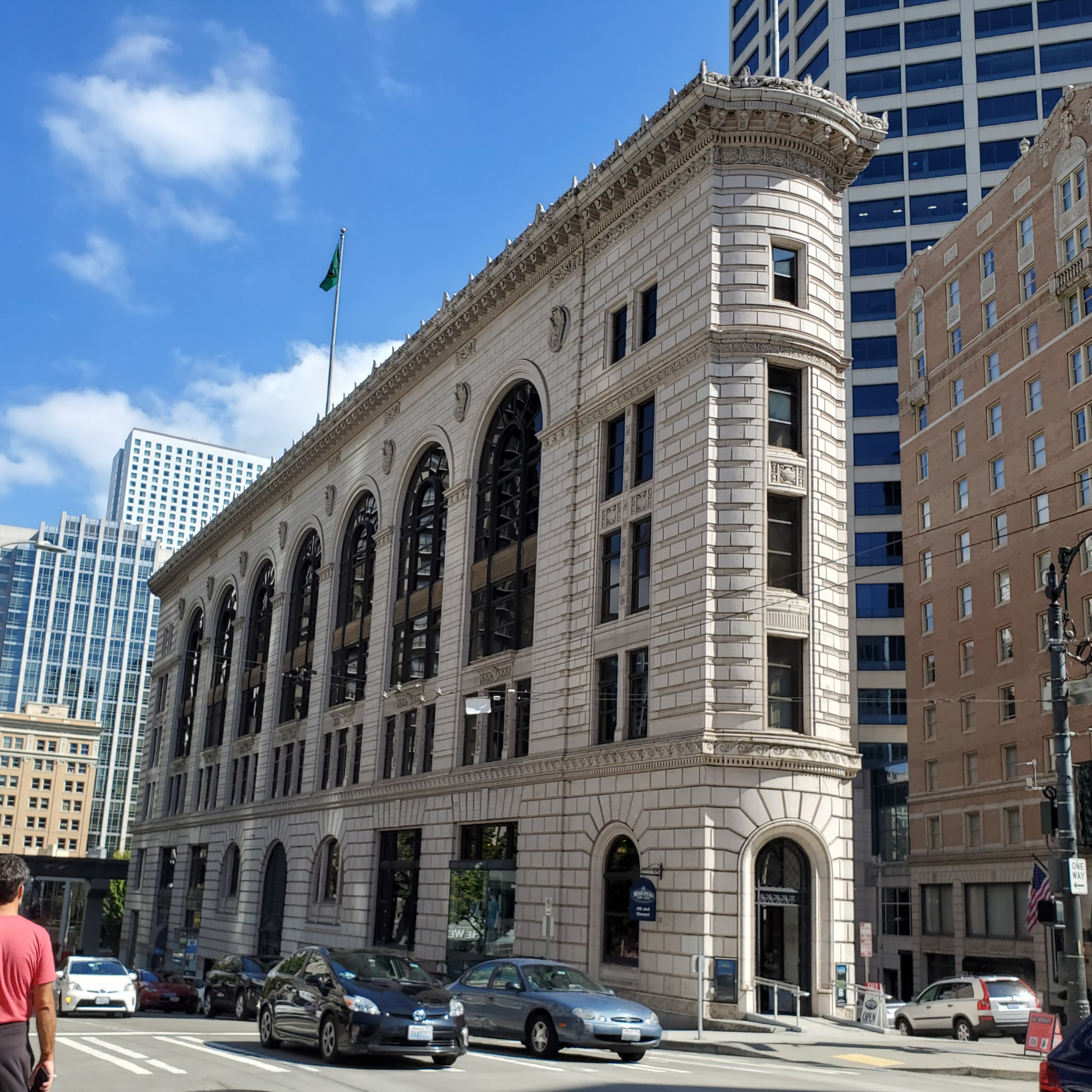
- The building in 2021
- Location: 414 Olive Way; Seattle, Washington
- Coordinates: 47°36′45″N 122°20′17″W
- Area: 64,516 square feet (5,993.7 m^{2})
- Built: 1912
- Architects: Charles Bebb and Carl Freylinghausen Gould
- Architectural style: Beaux-Arts
- Restored: 1992
- NRHP reference No.: 83003346

Significant dates
- Added to NRHP: January 27, 1983
- Designated SEATL: September 10, 1984

The Times Square Building, formerly the Times Building, is a registered landmark building in Seattle, Washington. It was completed in 1916 and housed editorial operations of the Seattle Times newspaper, which was housed there until 1930. Located at 414 Olive Way, it is entirely surrounded by streets: 4th Avenue, Olive Way, Stewart Street and 5th Avenue. The building has a Beaux-Arts design and flatiron shape. It is five stories high.

Designed by the Seattle architects Bebb and Gould, the Times Square building was listed on the National Register of Historic Places in 1983 and was designated a city landmark in 1984.
