= Carl Frelinghuysen Gould =

American architect (1873–1939)

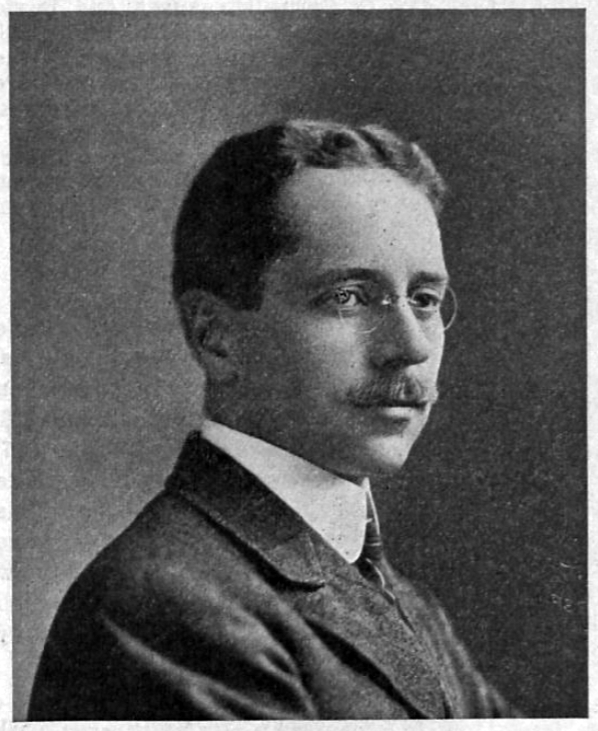
- Carl Gould c.1911
- Born: 24 November 1873; New York City
- Died: 4 January 1939 (aged 65); Swedish Medical Center; Seattle, Washington
- Education: Harvard University
- Known for: University of Washington College of Architecture and Urban Planning
- Spouse: Dorothy Wheaton Fay
- Children: Anne Westbrook Gould, Carl Frelinghuysen Gould Jr.
- Parent: Charles Judson Gould

Carl Frelinghuysen Gould (24 November 1873 – 4 January 1939) also spelled Carl Freylinghausen Gould, was an architect in the Pacific Northwest, and founder and first chair of the architecture program at the University of Washington. As the lead designer in the firm Bebb and Gould, with his partner, Charles H. Bebb, Gould was responsible for many notable Pacific Northwest buildings, such as the original Seattle Art Museum and for the campus plan of the University of Washington.

== Biography ==
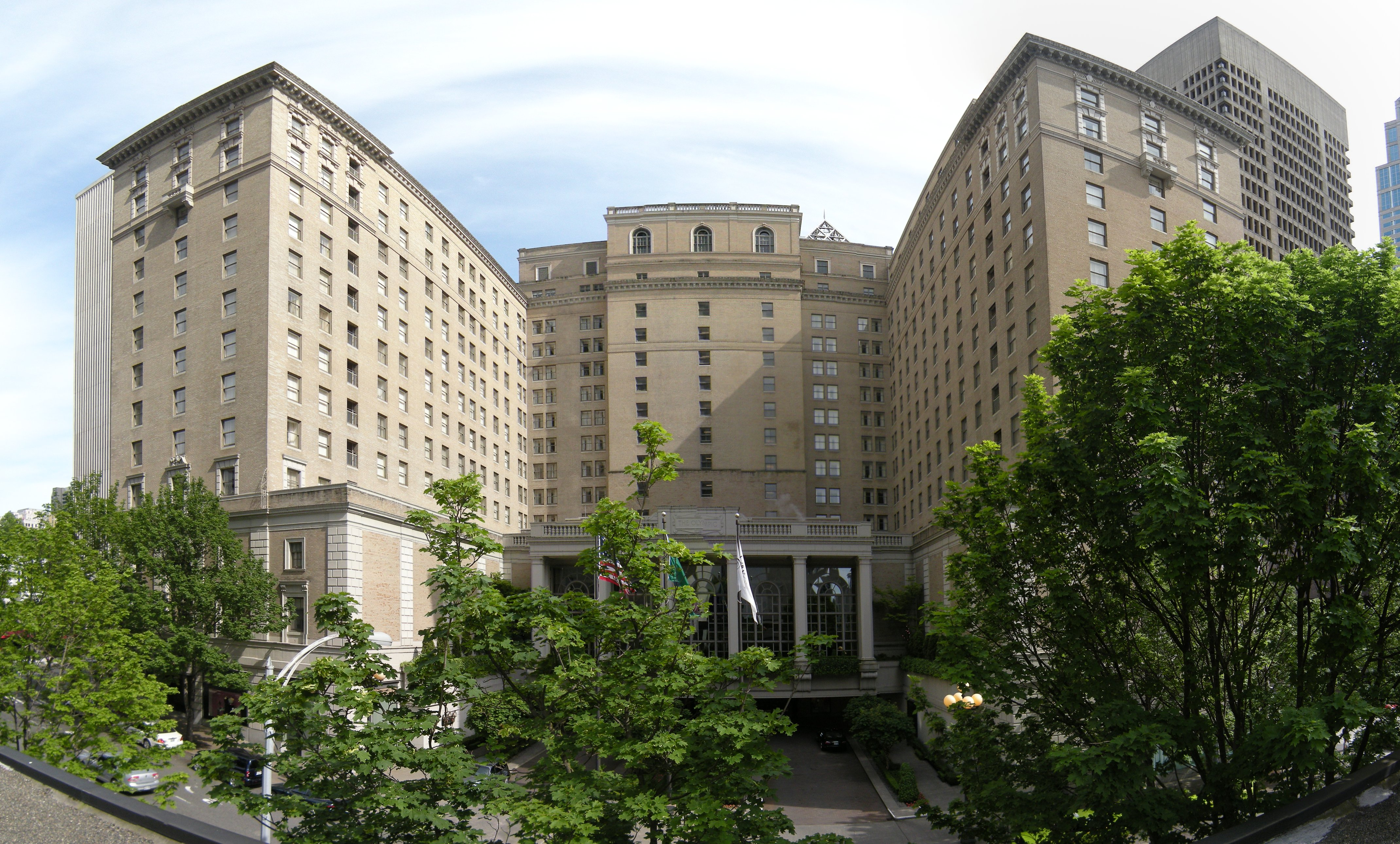
Olympic Hotel, Seattle

He was born in New York City to wealthy tea merchant Charles Judson Gould and Annie E. Westbrook Gould and spent his childhood between houses on West 50th Street in Manhattan and suburban Nyack, New York. He graduated from Harvard in 1898, then spent five years at the École nationale supérieure des Beaux-Arts in Paris. After his return to New York, he apprenticed with McKim, Mead and White, D. H. Burnham & Company, and George B. Post and Sons.

In 1908 Gould moved to Seattle. After working briefly for other architects, Gould initiated his own practice. His early commissions were primarily residential. One of his first commissions was a Dutch/gothic style residence on Federal Ave in Seattle that was the home for several decades of Teddy Roosevelt's granddaughter. Gould quickly emerged as a leader in city planning, as he campaigned for Bogue Plan (1911), which proposed a City Beautiful civic center for the city. In 1912, Gould became president of the Seattle Fine Arts Society, serving until 1916. He also began giving lectures in domestic design at the University of Washington.

In 1914, Gould partnered with Seattle architect Charles H. Bebb to form Bebb and Gould, a firm that soon won the commission to plan the University of Washington campus (1915). Thereafter Bebb and Gould completed a number of campus buildings; most important was Suzzallo Library (1922–1927). From this auspicious start, the firm emerged as leading designers of institutional and other buildings in the Pacific Northwest. Their work included residences, churches, schools, hospitals, memorials, club houses, commercial structures and other buildings. The firms work was stylistically eclectic, reflecting Gould's Beaux-Arts training and the tendencies of the period.

Gould founded the University of Washington program in architecture in 1914 and served as the first chair of the Architecture Department (1914–1926). Gould modeled the program after that of the Beaux-Arts as it had been adapted by American collegiate programs in architecture. Throughout Gould's tenure the program belonged to the Beaux-Arts Institute of Design (BAID), although Gould supplemented BAID programmes with studio assignments he and the other faculty developed themselves.

He married Dorothy Wheaton Fay in 1915.

Gould contributed to the U.S. effort in World War I, by designing a 3,000-worker community in Washington as a company town supporting the Spruce Production Division. The half-mile-square townsite was laid out with bunkhouses, and dining and recreation halls styled after Adirondack lodges.

Gould again served as President of the Seattle Fine Arts Society from 1926 to 1929 and was instrumental in its restructuring as the Art Institute of Seattle (predecessor to today's Seattle Art Museum). Gould served as President of the American Institute of Architects Washington State Chapter (predecessor to AIA Seattle Chapter) from 1922 to 1924. He was elected a Fellow in the AIA in 1926.

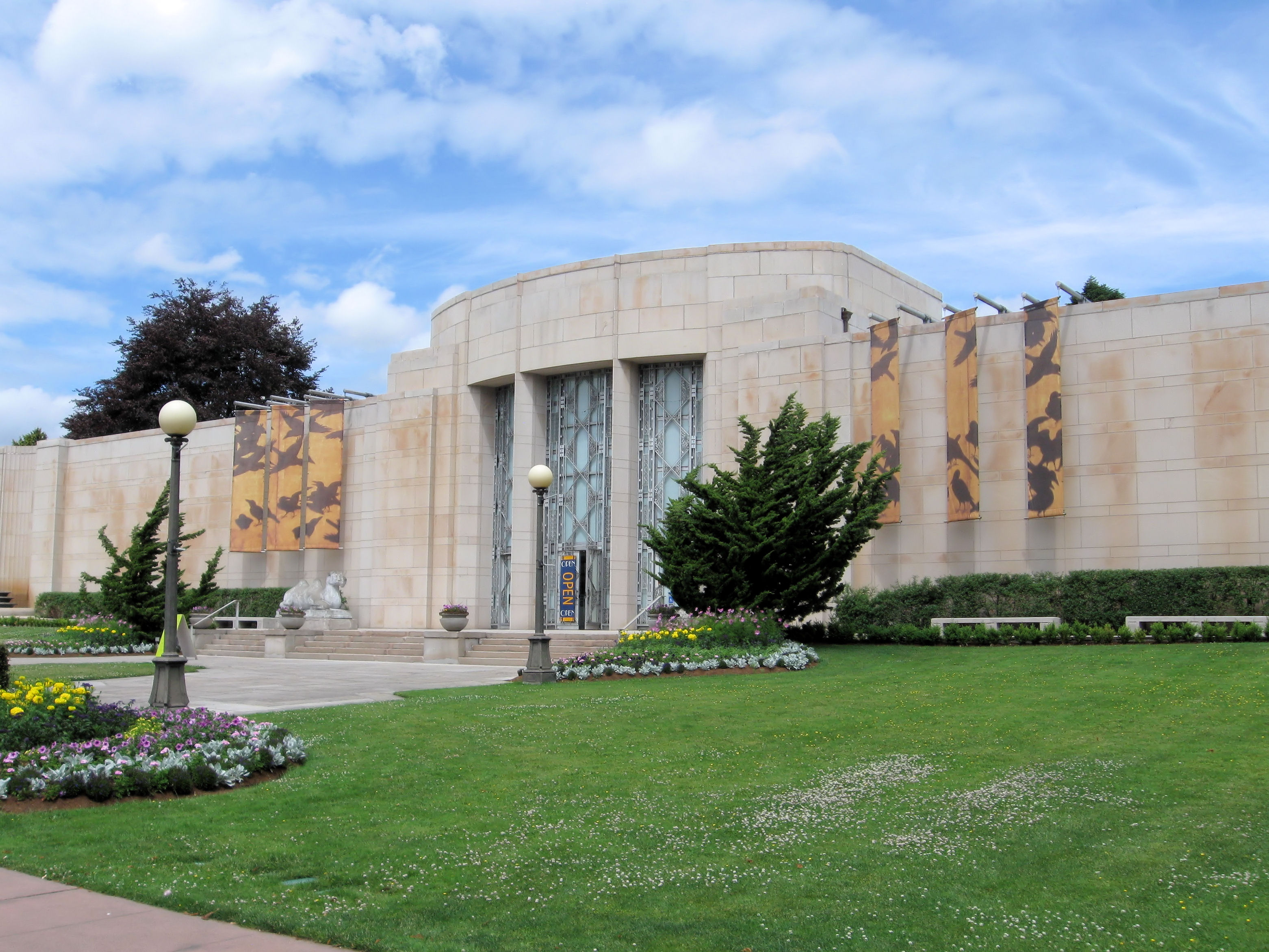
Seattle Asian Art Museum (originally Seattle Art Museum), Volunteer Park

By the 1930s, Bebb's role in Bebb and Gould declined and the firm's work began to reflect the emergence of Art Deco. This new direction was reflected in the design for the Seattle Art Museum building (1931–1933) (now the Seattle Asian Art Museum) in Volunteer Park. (The design of the front elevation reflects the influence of draftsman Walter Wurdeman who had joined Bebb and Gould after graduating from the University of Washington.) Work slowed thereafter, as the Depression limited opportunities, although the firm designed several more University of Washington buildings in this period, and, as campus architects after 1932, supervised designs by other architects. In 1933 Gould was commissioned to design a new building to house the Everett Public Library. A masterwork of early-thirties design, the new Everett Public Library opened to the public on October 3, 1934.

He died on 4 January 1939.

== Works ==
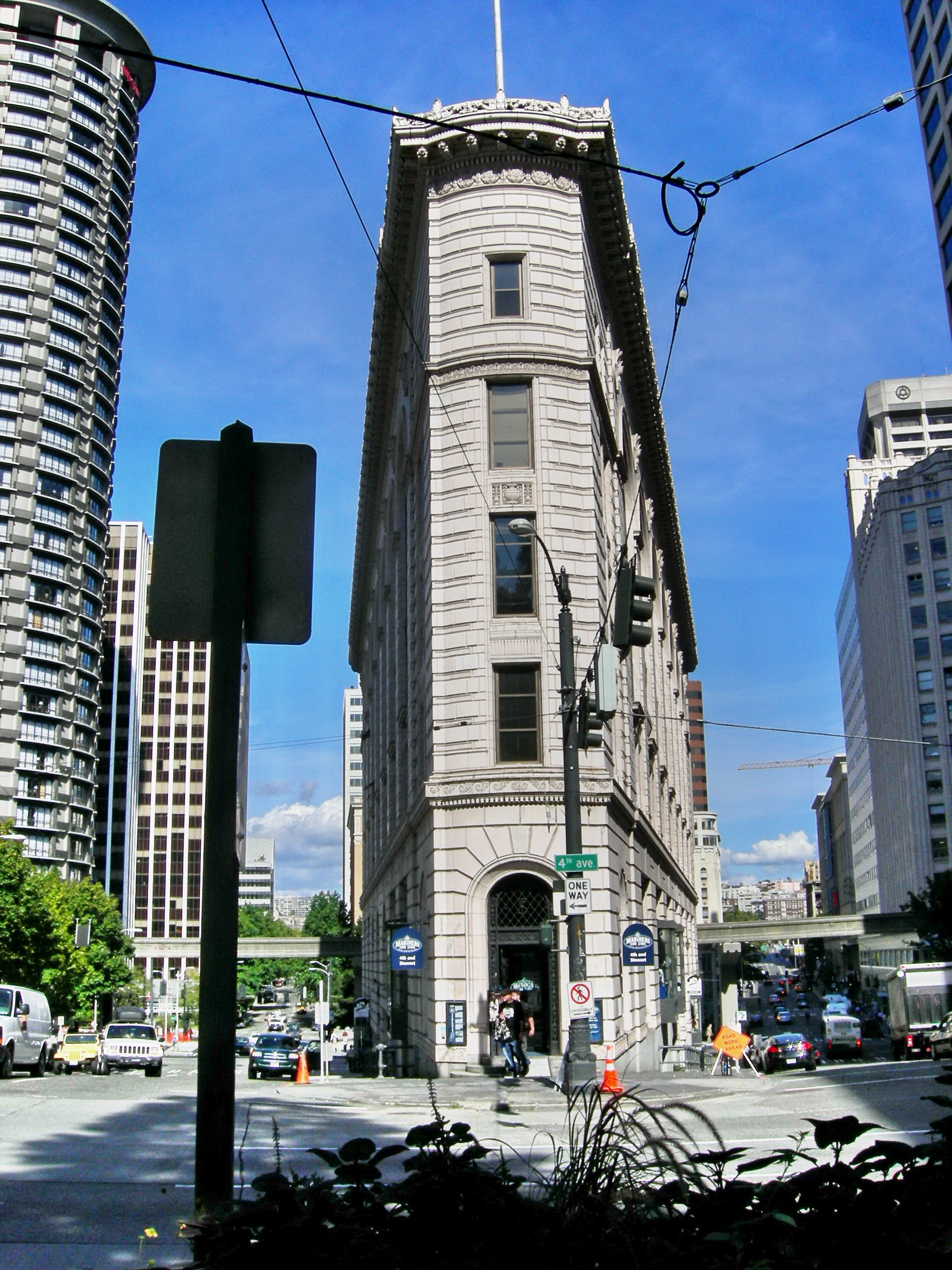
Times Building, Seattle

Works by Gould or by his partnership include many that survive and/or are listed on the U.S. National Register of Historic Places (NRHP). These include:

- U.S. Immigration Building, 84 Union St., Seattle, Washington (Gould, Carl F.) NRHP-listed
- Weyerhaeuser Office Building, Boxcar Park, Everett, Washington (Gould, Carl F.) NRHP-listed
- Young Women's Christian Association, 1026 N. Forest St., Bellingham, Washington (Gould, Carl F.) NRHP-listed
- One or more properties in NRHP-listed Centralia Downtown Historic District, Roughly bounded by Center St., Burlington Northern right-of-way, Walnut st., and Pearl St., Centralia, Washington (Bebb and Gould)
- Larrabee House, 405 Fieldstone Rd., Bellingham, Washington (Bebb & Gould) NRHP-listed
- Olympic Hotel, 1200–1220 4th Ave., Seattle, Washington (Bebb & Gould) NRHP-listed
- Pacific Telephone and Telegraph Building, 1304 Vandercook Way Longview WA Bebb & Gould) NRHP-listed
- Times Building, 414 Olive Way, Seattle, Washington (Bebb & Gould) NRHP-listed
- U.S. Marine Hospital (Seattle, Washington), 1131 14th Ave., S., Seattle, Washington (Bebb & Gould) NRHP-listed
- Volunteer Park, Between E. Prospect and E. Galer Sts., and Federal and E. 15th Aves., Seattle, Washington (Bebb & Gould) NRHP-listed
- Administration Building and Cavanaugh House at the Hiram M. Chittenden Locks

== Legacy ==
After Gould's unexpected death in 1939, Bebb took trusted employee John Paul Jones into the partnership and the firm was renamed Bebb and Jones.

Overall, Carl F. Gould was a key figure in architecture and the arts in Seattle in the first four decades of the twentieth century. Gould's daughter, Anne Gould Hauberg continued to play a significant role in Seattle as patron of the arts today.

In 1941 his daughter, Anne Westbrook Gould, married John Henry Hauberg Jr.

The family papers are archived at the University of Washington.

Carl F. Gould is also the namesake of Gould Hall, which is the headquarters of the College of Built Environments at the University of Washington.
