= Pacific Tower (Seattle) =

Hospital in Seattle, Washington, U.S.

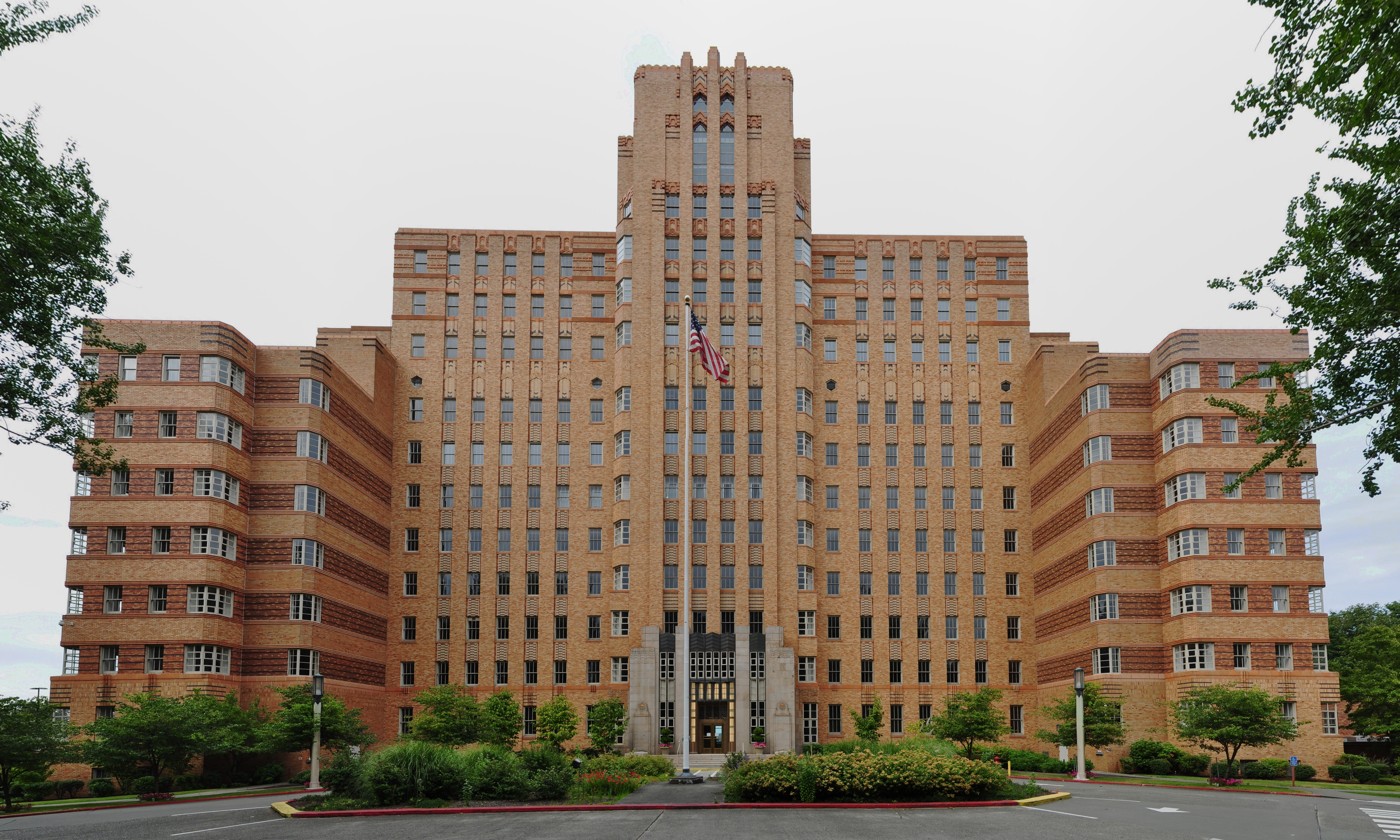
- Pacific Tower in 2012

- Location within Downtown Seattle
- Alternative names: Pacific Medical Center; Pacific Hospital Preservation and Development Authority; US Marine Hospital; PacMed Building

General information
- Type: Health facility Former hospital Former corporate headquarters
- Architectural style: Art Deco
- Location: 1200 12th Avenue South; Seattle, Washington, U.S.
- Coordinates: 47.5928°N 122.3158°W
- Elevation: 350 ft (110 m)

Height
- Height: 239 ft (73 m)

Technical details
- Floor count: 16
- Floor area: 259,703 sq ft (24,127.2 m^{2})
- Pacific Tower
- U.S. National Register of Historic Places
- NRHP reference No.: 79002543

The Pacific Tower, formerly the Pacific Medical Center, is a 16-story building at 1200 12th Avenue South on Beacon Hill in Seattle, Washington, United States. It was completed in 1932 and opened the following year as a U.S. Public Health Service facility. The lower floors of the facility still function as a medical center today.

Amazon.com occupied much of the building as its headquarters from 1999 until 2010. Much of the space was left vacant after Amazon relocated to South Lake Union. In 2013, the State of Washington agreed to a 30-year lease of 13 floors. Seattle Central College subleases six floors for its healthcare training program.

The building was designed by Carl Frelinghuysen Gould of Bebb and Gould with assistance from John Graham & Company, and built in a distinctive Art Deco style. The structure is perched on a hill overlooking downtown Seattle and is a prominent part of the city's skyline. It has been listed in the National Register of Historic Places and has been recognized as a landmark by the City of Seattle. The building was retrofitted to better withstand an earthquake in the 1990s; however, portions of the building suffered significant damage during the 2001 Nisqually earthquake.

== History ==
=== Marine Hospital ===
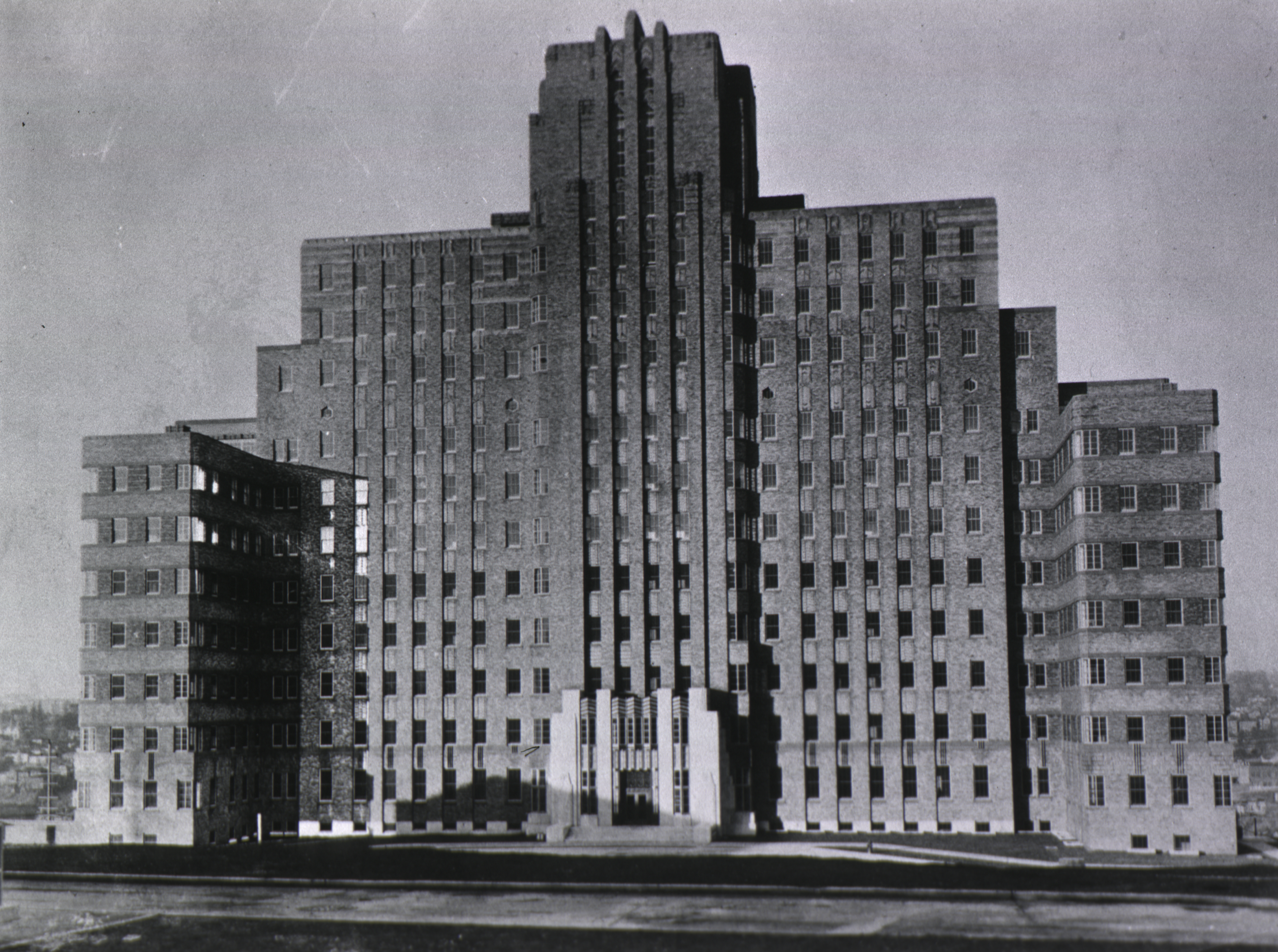
Undated historic view of the hospital

The building was opened in 1933 by the U.S. government as a U.S. Public Health Service Marine Hospital, replacing a facility in Port Townsend. Upon opening it had a total of 312 beds. The hospital originally served veterans, merchant seamen, the U.S. Coast Guard, the U.S. Lighthouse Service, and poor and indigent people defined as "federal compensation cases".

In 1951, it was re-designated as a Public Health Service Hospital along with all other Marine Hospitals. Two years later, a three-story annex was constructed on the east end of the building to serve outpatient clinics.

Two stair towers were added to the south face in 1975. The building was further expanded in 1980, when a laboratory and primary care addition were built.

=== Office building ===
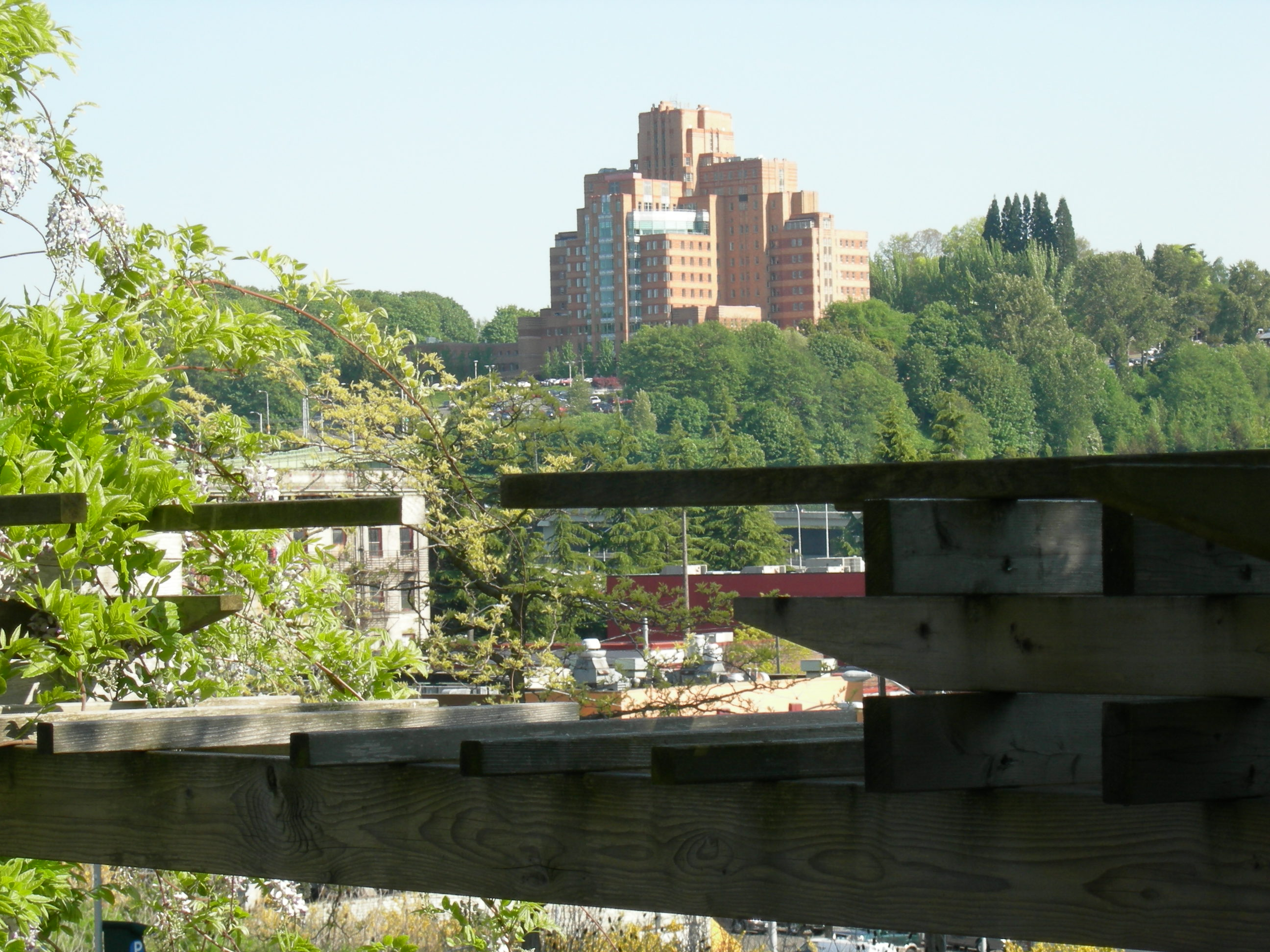
A remote view of the tower

The federal government ceased operation of the facility and other similar hospitals in 1981. Control was shifted to the City of Seattle, and the city chartered the Pacific Hospital Preservation and Development Authority (PHPDA). The PHPDA owns the property and uses long-term tenants with leases. Lease revenues are to advance the PHPDA's mission of providing health care services to low-income uninsured and under-insured persons in King County. The lease agreement with WRC.Com Tower LLC was signed in 1998 and was terminated in 2012.

A $9.3 million county bond paid for seismic improvements between 1991 and 1994. A new tower was constructed on the north side of the building to create a buttress for the original structure. The addition was designed by architects Zimmer Gunsul Frasca, and received an award from the American Institute of Architects for its innovative design that was inline with the building's historical facade. The project created 70,000 sq ft (6,500 m^{2}) of additional space that was not initially occupied.

As the medical organization struggled financially, attempts to lease at least 155,000 sq ft (14,400 m^{2}) of the building failed over several years. With medical facilities continuing to occupy the bottom two floors of the building in 1998, Amazon.com signed a sublease for $1.5 million a year through 2010.

The building suffered substantial damage during the 2001 Nisqually earthquake as the structure's upper floor twisted in a corkscrew fashion. On the top three floors, 80 percent of the perimeter walls were damaged. A brick pinnacle on the upper roof collapsed and fell through a roof on the 10th floor. An elevator shaft and five floors were flooded when a mechanical water line ruptured. There were no injuries but it was estimated that the repairs would cost $6 million. During repairs, efforts were made to reuse the brick and terracotta, and the same colors and style were sourced when replacement was needed.

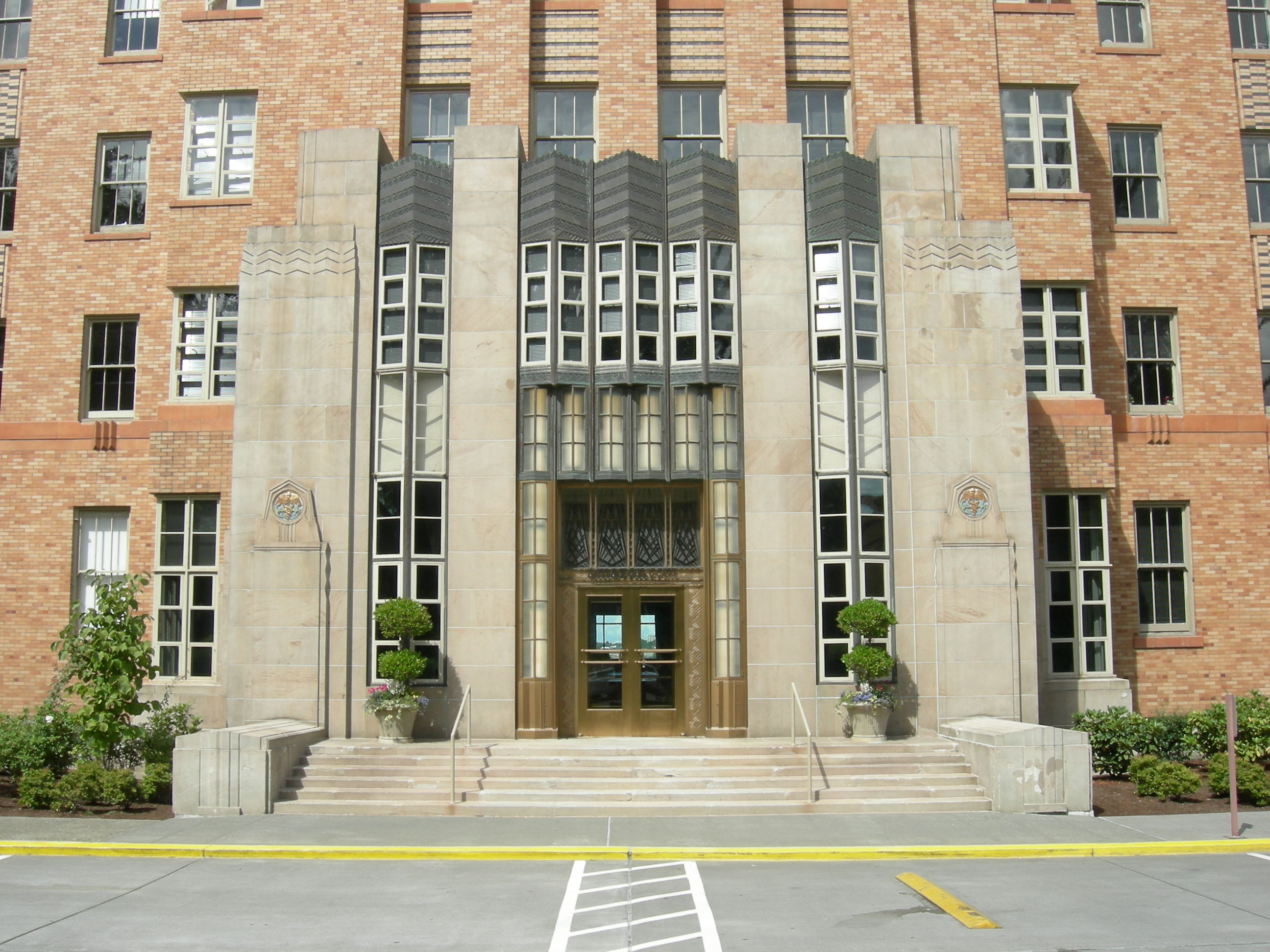
The south entrance, 2007

Amazon continued to occupy their floors during rehabilitation of the structure. In 2003, the clinical group practice of the PHPDA officially split off to form a 501(c)(3) health care organization, PacMed Clinics (doing business as Pacific Medical Centers or PMC). The Pacific Medical Center Clinic continues to operate in the first two floors of the building. In 2010, Amazon.com ended its sub-lease with WRC.Com Tower LLC and began the move of its headquarters to a new campus in the city's South Lake Union neighborhood. Much of the building was left vacant without new tenants moving into the space. The location outside of downtown Seattle was a constraint for businesses.

Washington State House Speaker Frank Chopp spearheaded a plan to use government funding to move community college health programs into the building. In August 2013, the PHPDA announced a 30-year lease with the Washington State Department of Commerce for 13 stories of Pacific Tower. Six of the stories will be subleased to Seattle Colleges for its healthcare training programs.

Many nonprofit organizations are located in the building, including Neighborcare Health, 501 Commons, Building Changes, the Cross Cultural Health Care Program, and the Smart Buildings Center. Chopp and other state lawmakers consolidated several district offices into the location. The state capital budget allocated $20 million for the tower's renovation. The cost increased to $54.3 million by the time it was completed in 2016 due to unexpected water damage and new city energy-use regulations.

=== Housing ===
In October 2022, construction began on a seven-story addition to the Pacific Tower that is planned to include 270 units of affordable housing. The addition includes two buildings on the north side of the tower with an early childhood education center operated by El Centro de la Raza and offices for an unspecified non-profit tenant. The project is managed by the Seattle Chinatown International District Preservation Development Authority and financed with loans and grants from local governments and private contributors, including Amazon. It is scheduled to open in two phases, with the first scheduled for 2024.

== Design ==
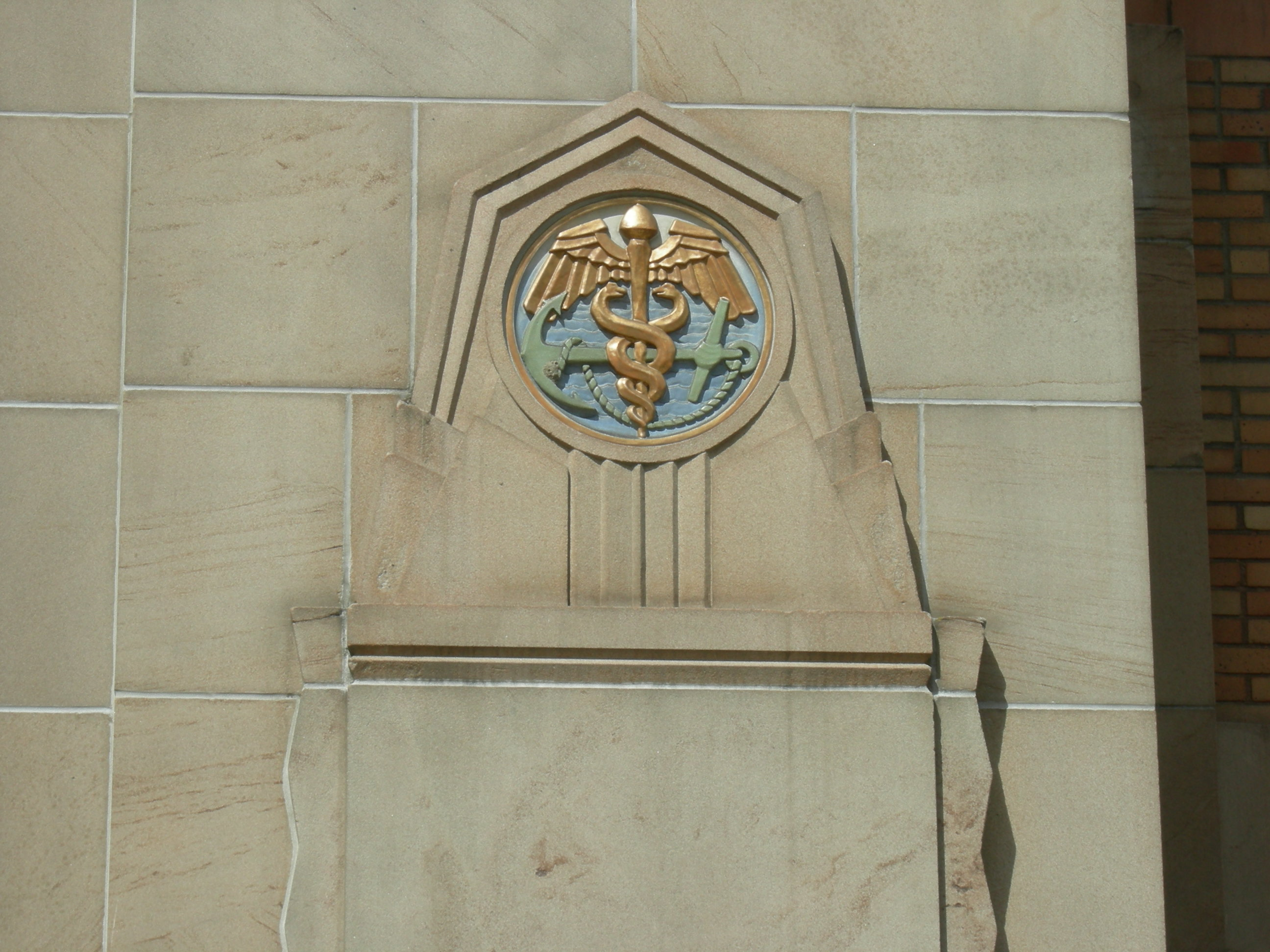
An anchor and caduceus from the building's use as a Marine facility

Architectural firm Bebb and Gould, assisted by the John Graham Company, designed the original structure. Carl Frelinghuysen Gould designed it in an Art Deco style. Located 350 ft (110 m) above sea level at the northern edge of Beacon Hill, the 239 ft (73 m) tower overlooks downtown Seattle and Elliott Bay. The 259,703 sq ft (24,127.2 m^{2}) building sits on a 9.5-acre (3.8 ha) landscaped property. It was listed in the National Register of Historic Places in 1979. In 1992, the building received landmark status from the city.

The northern addition completed in 1994 was considered significant by the American Institute of Architects. It was noted that the exterior of the building could have been supported by new beams and trusses. Instead, the new space integrated almost seamlessly with the original building while being seismically beneficial. In 2017 painter Ari Glass was commissioned to create an installation at the Pacific Tower. Several of his new works will be a permanent addition to the North Entrance of the Pacific Tower.

The main building and its surrounding campus are surrounded by manicured grounds. The property includes six buildings near the primary structure. These were originally quarters for officers but have since been converted into laboratory and office space. The buildings are in the same style as the main building with facades that include terracotta ornamental details and brick patterns. Other additions include a parking garage and smaller metal buildings. The property is surrounded by a detailed wrought iron fence.
