= Seattle Asian Art Museum =

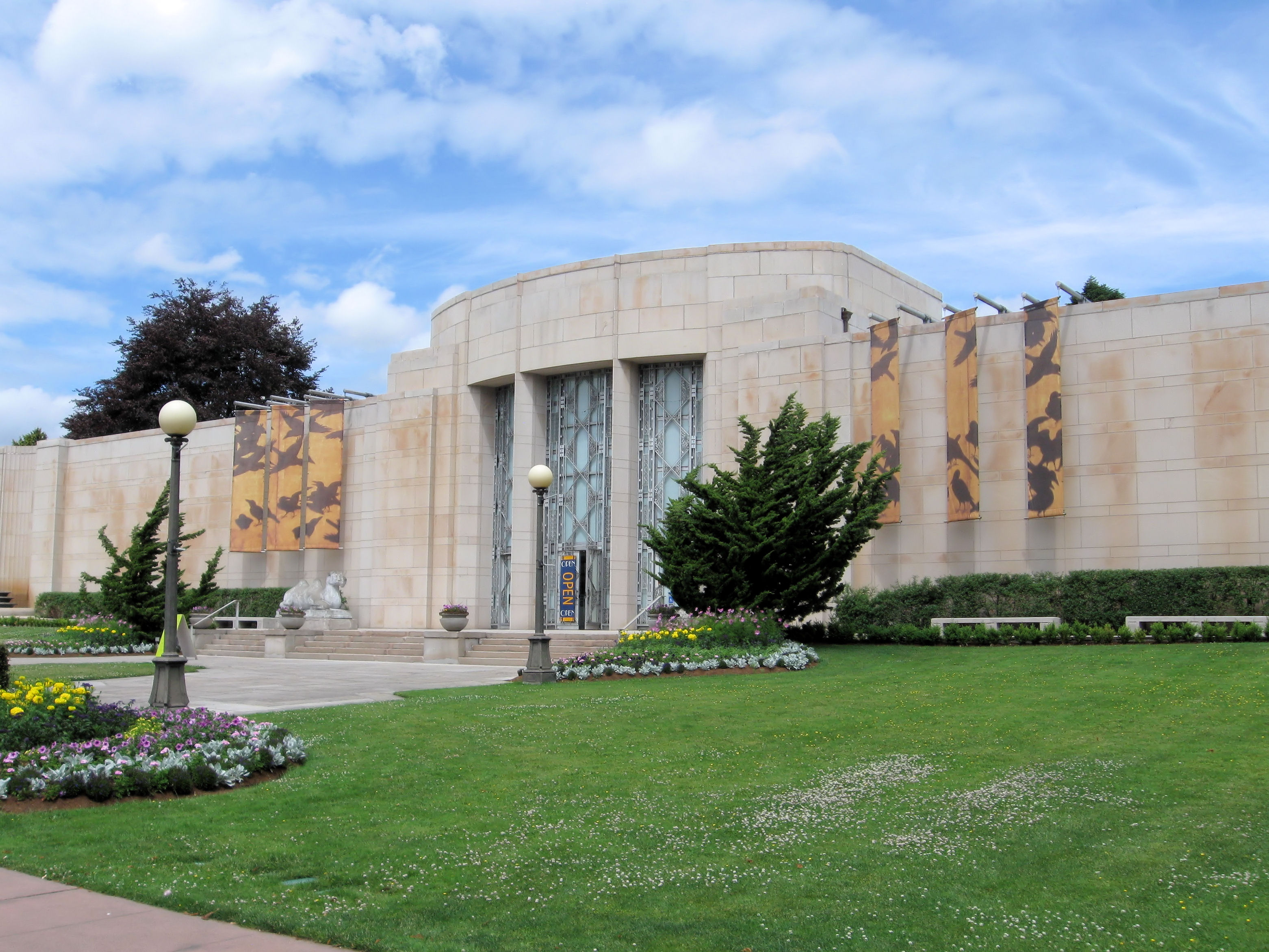
- Seattle Asian Art Museum in 2008
- Established: 1994
- Location: Volunteer Park; Seattle, Washington, U.S.
- Type: Art museum
- Collections: Historic and contemporary Asian art
- Architect: LMN Architects (2020 expansion)
- Owner: City of Seattle
- Public transit access: Capitol Hill station
- Website: Seattle Asian Art Museum
- Seattle Art Museum
- U.S. National Register of Historic Places
- Seattle Landmark
- Location within Washington (state)
- Location: Seattle, Washington
- Coordinates: 47.6303°N 122.3143°W
- Built: 1933
- Architect: Carl F. Gould
- Architectural style: Art Moderne
- NRHP reference No.: 16000474

Significant dates
- Added to NRHP: July 20, 2016
- Designated SEATL: June 21, 1989

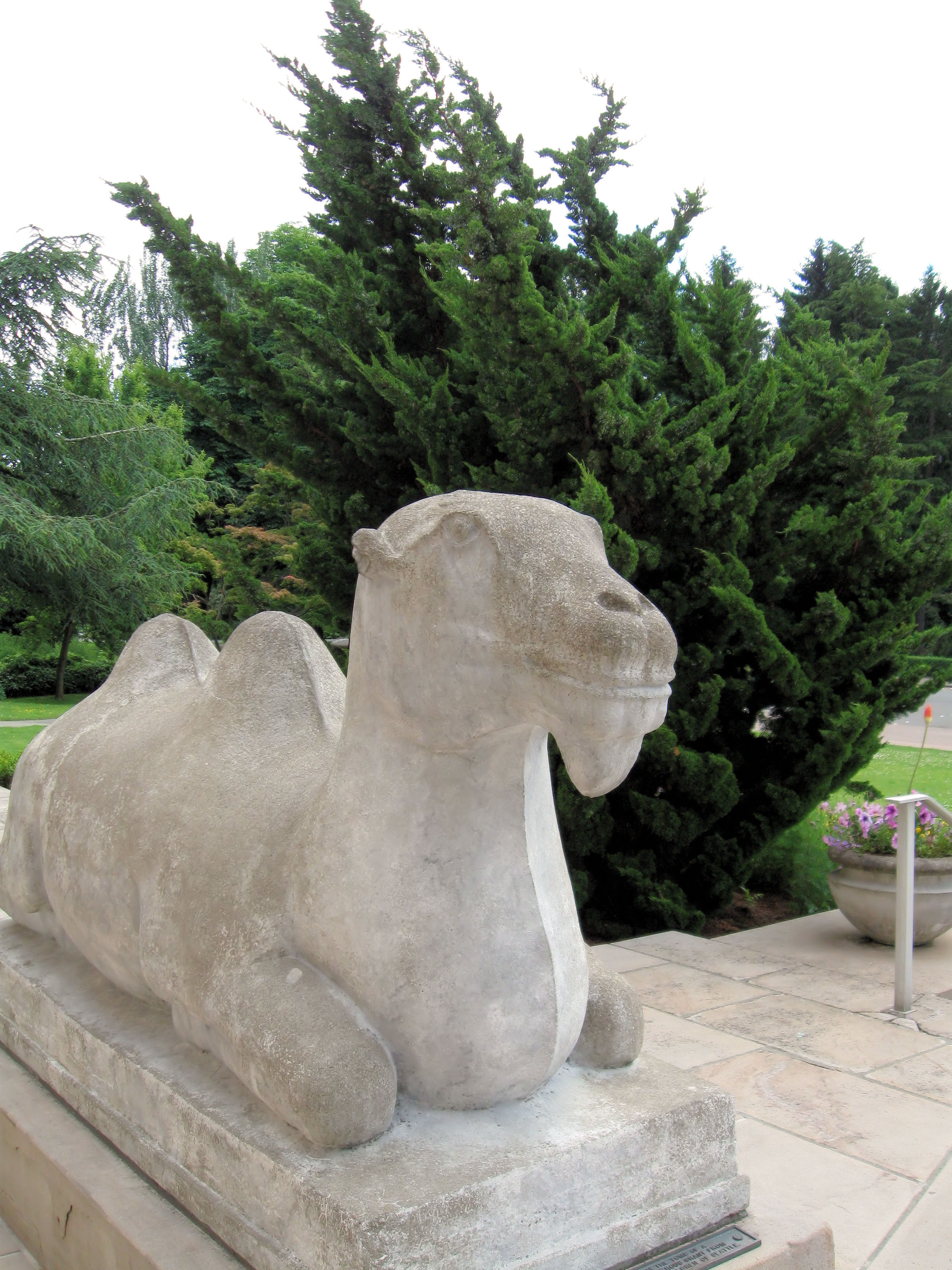
Camel statue in front of the SAAM

The Seattle Asian Art Museum (often abbreviated to SAAM) is a museum of Asian art at Volunteer Park in the Capitol Hill neighborhood of Seattle, Washington, United States. Part of the Seattle Art Museum, the SAAM exhibits historic and contemporary artworks from China, Korea, Japan, India, the Himalayas, and other Southeast Asian countries. It also features an education center, conservation center, and library. The museum is located in the 1933 Art Deco building which was originally home to the Seattle Art Museum's main collection. In 1991 the main collection moved to a newly constructed Seattle Art Museum building in the downtown area. The Seattle Asian Art Museum opened in 1994.

== About ==
The SAAM is organized thematically, with art and objects grouped by their relationship to themes including "spirituality, worship, celebration, visual arts, literature, clothing, nature and the power of birth and death." The museum's permanent collection spans thirteen galleries. There is one large gallery reserved for special exhibitions which changes every six months.

== History ==
The Seattle Art Museum was founded in 1933 by Richard E. Fuller, a collector of Asian art. Sixty years later, in 1993, the main Seattle Art Museum announced that it would open an Asian art museum at its original Volunteer Park location. A reception, held November 1993 as part of the APEC Summit, was attended by the leaders of East Asian nations and 400 guests. The SAAM officially opened to the public on August 13, 1994, during a ceremony attended by 6,000 visitors.

The museum houses an Asian Paintings Conservation Center.

== Architecture ==
The Seattle Asian Art Museum is housed in a historic Art Deco building designed in 1933 by Carl F. Gould of the architectural firm Bebb and Gould. From 1933 to 1991, the building served as the home of the Seattle Art Museum and its main collection. After the main collection moved to a new museum in Downtown Seattle, the building underwent an early renovation in the 1990s at a cost of $5.2 million. The Gould building was designated a Seattle landmark in 1989, and officially added to the National Register of Historic Places in 2016.

The museum underwent a major expansion project, starting in 2017, that was spurred by the need to upgrade the building's HVAC system, freight elevator, and seismic resistance. The project was funded by a mixture of public and private donations and included preservation of the museum's historic Art Deco facade, infrastructure upgrades, climate control and seismic system improvements, as well as the addition of new gallery and education spaces. Seattle-based firm LMN Architects was responsible for design of a US$56 million renovation and expansion of the building. Construction on the renovation project began with a ceremonial groundbreaking on March 13, 2018. The museum closed for three years for the major renovation, from February 2017 until February 2020. The new three-story wing is constructed principally out of glass and sandstone in a minimalist style.

== Collection ==
The Seattle Asian Art Museum holds a permanent collection of Chinese, Korean, Japanese, Indian, Himalayan, and Southeast Asian art. The museum continues to grow its collection of art "centered around historic, modern, and contemporary Asian Pacific Islander as well as Southeast Asian art, specifically collecting different works created by local Asian Pacific Islander artists within the Seattle area."

The collection holds the artwork entitled Some/One by South Korean sculptor Do-Ho Suh in the form of a suit of armor made of thousands of military IDs, or dog-tags. South Korean ceramic artist Yoon Kwang-cho is also represented in the collection.

== Gallery ==
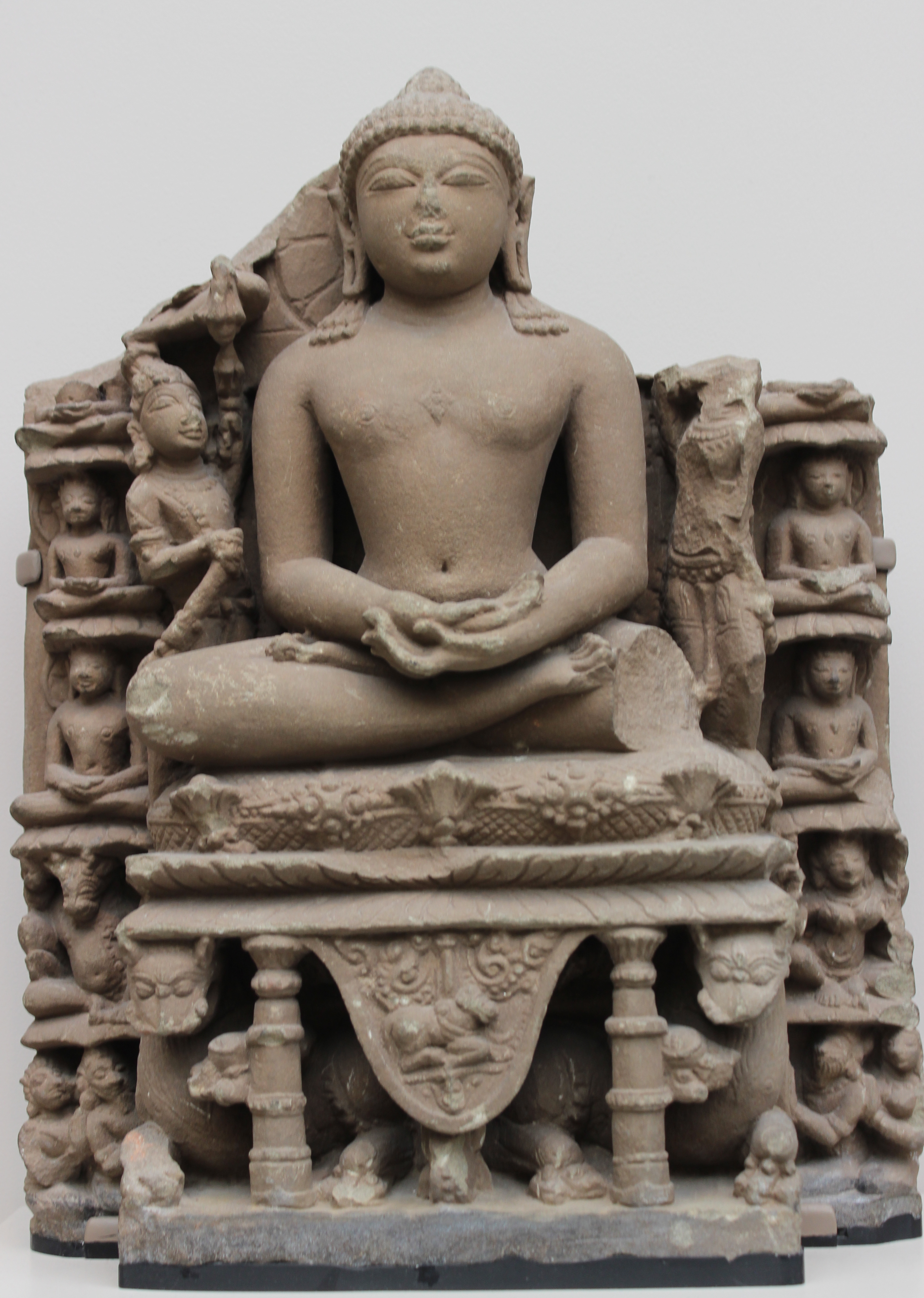
Rishabhanatha sculpture, 10th Century

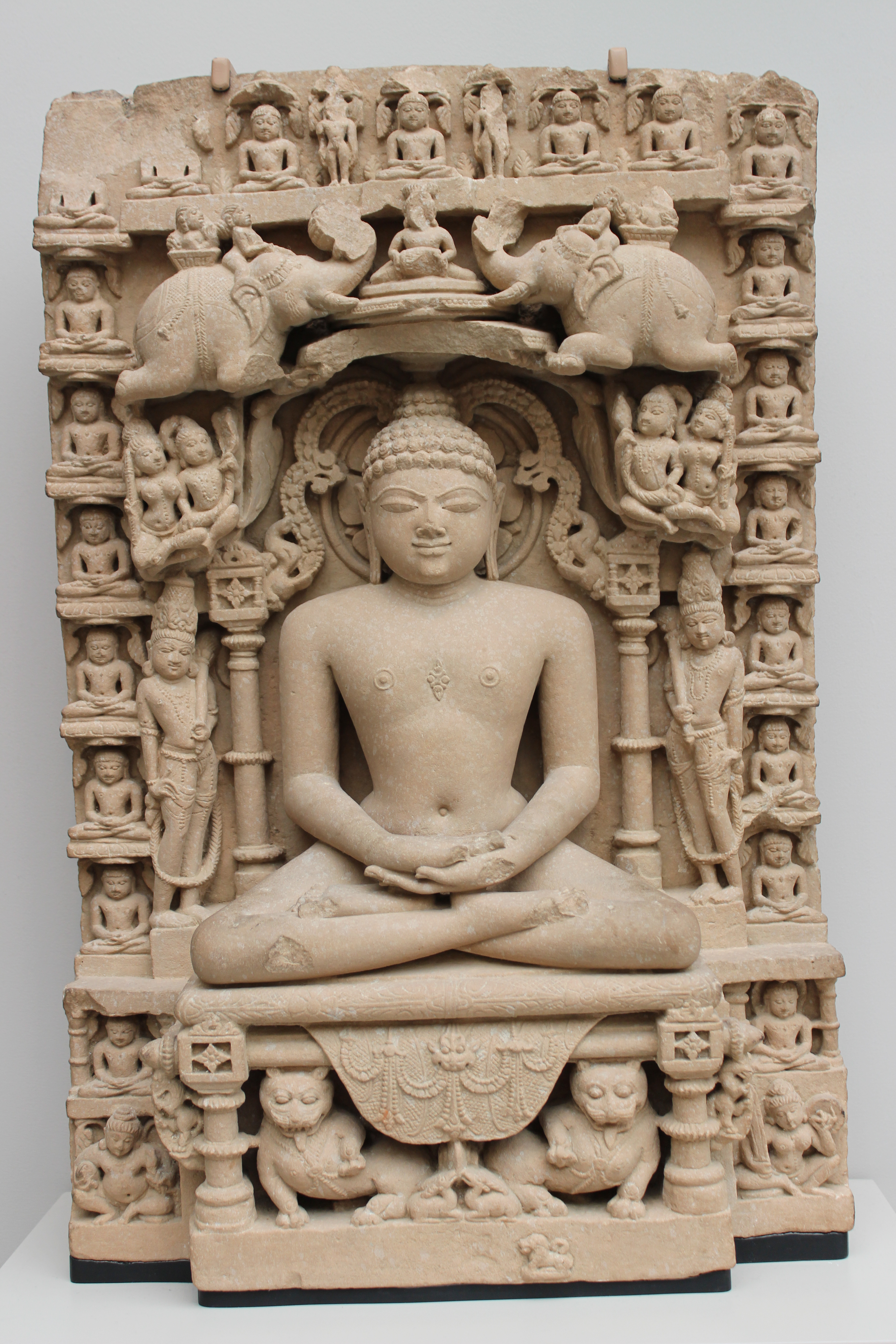
Mahavira sculpture, 11th Century

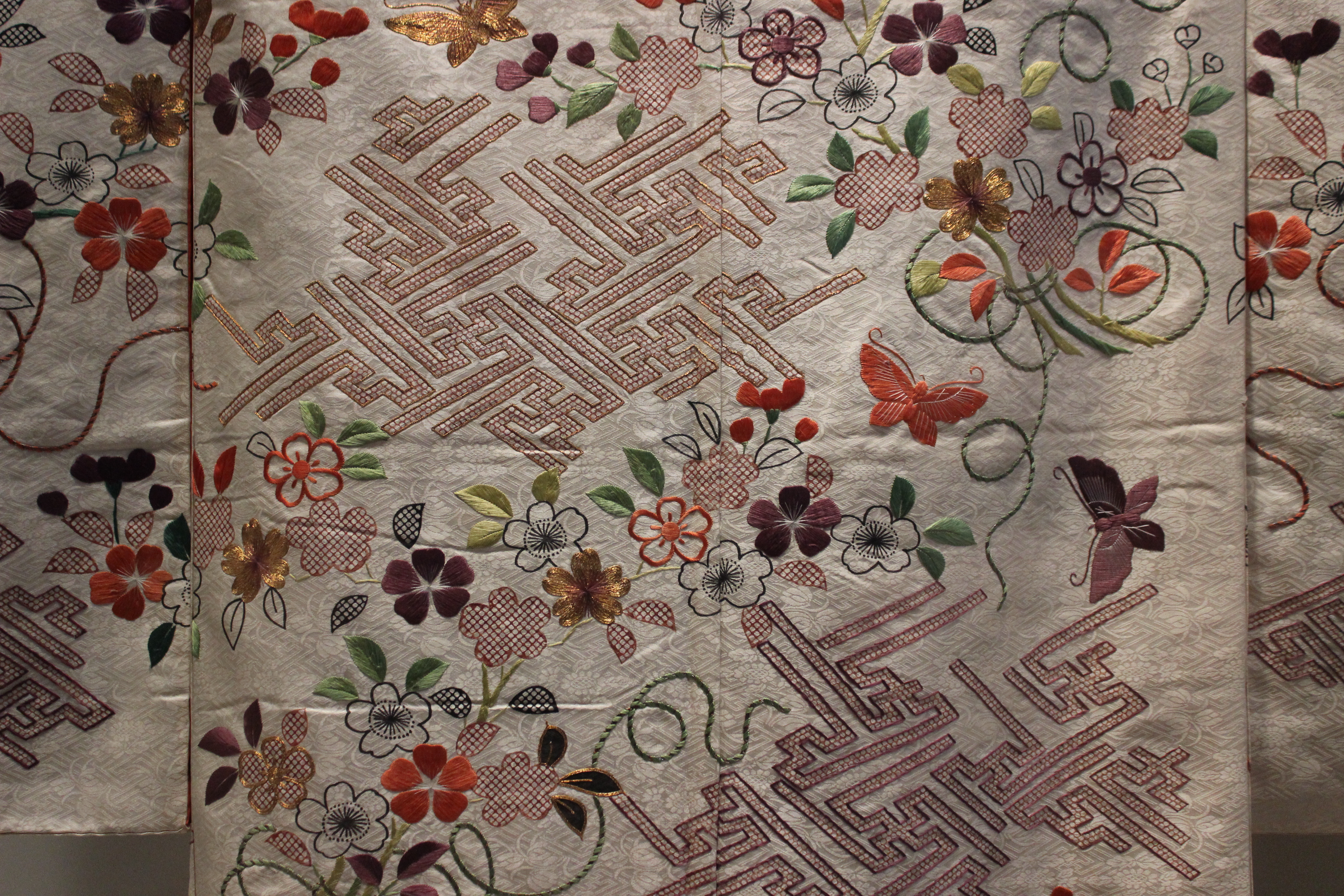
Furisode, Japan, 1800

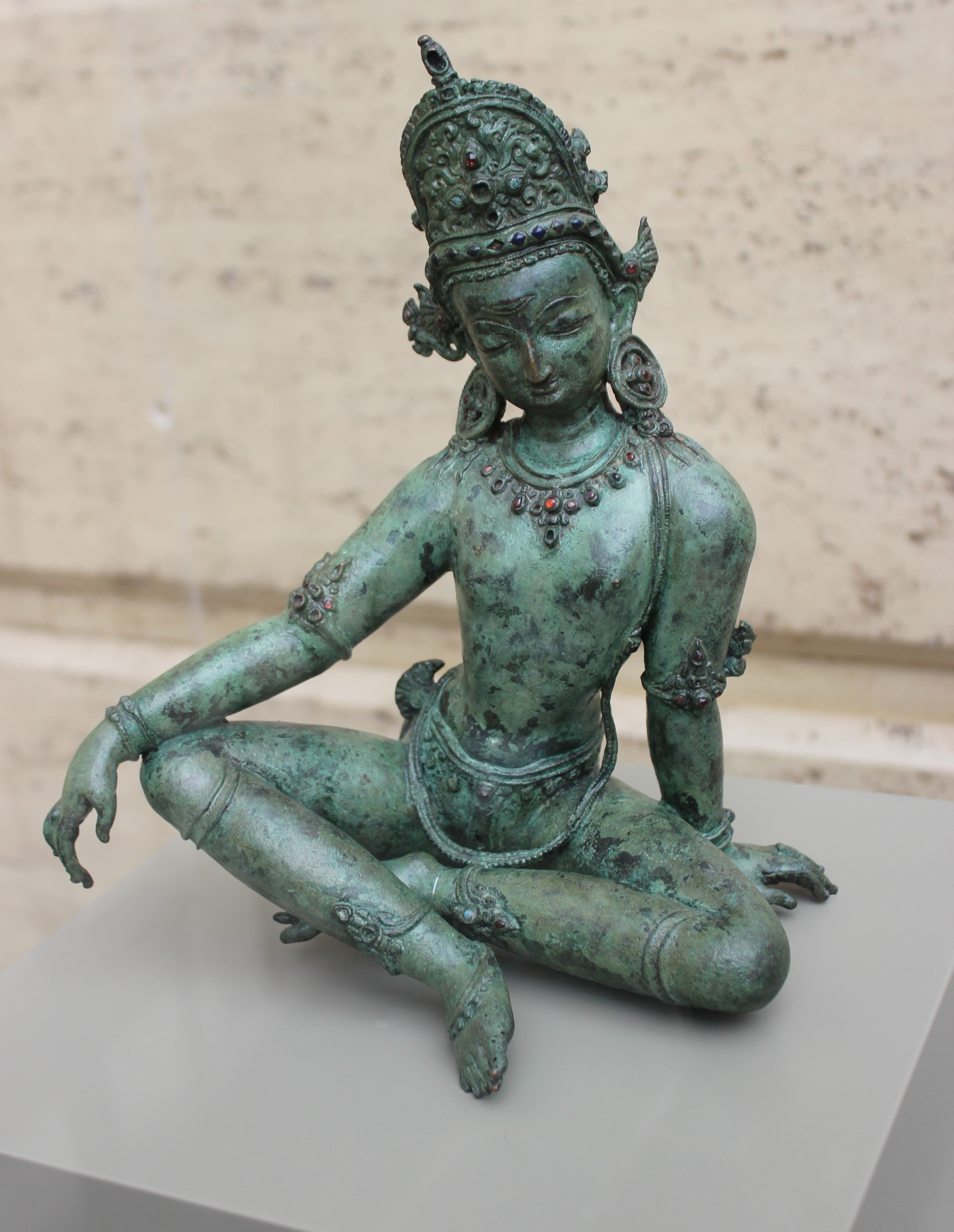
Indra, Nepal, 13th century

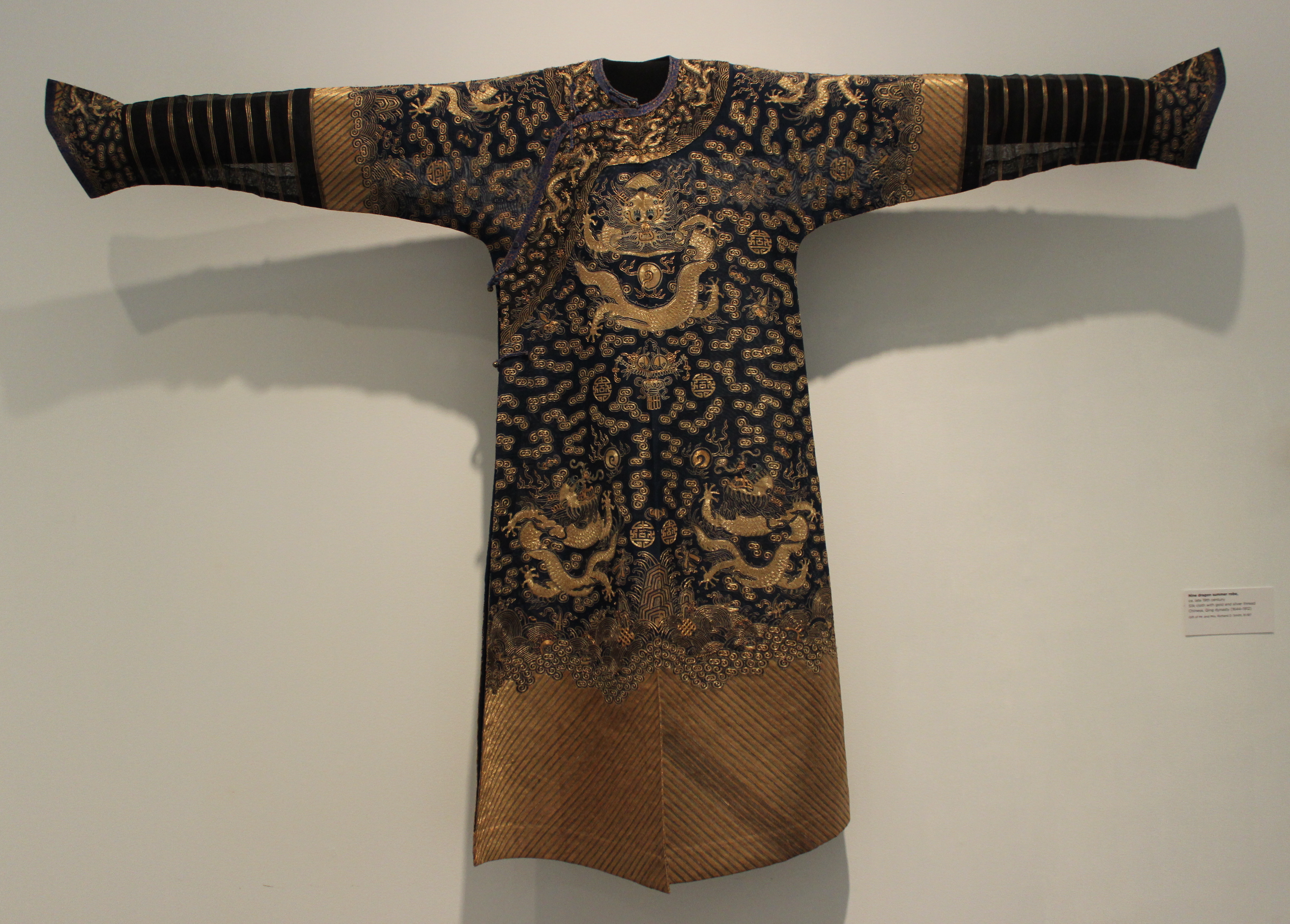
Nine dragons Summer Robe, China
