= Lairmont Manor =

Historic house in Washington, United States

- Larrabee House
- U.S. National Register of Historic Places
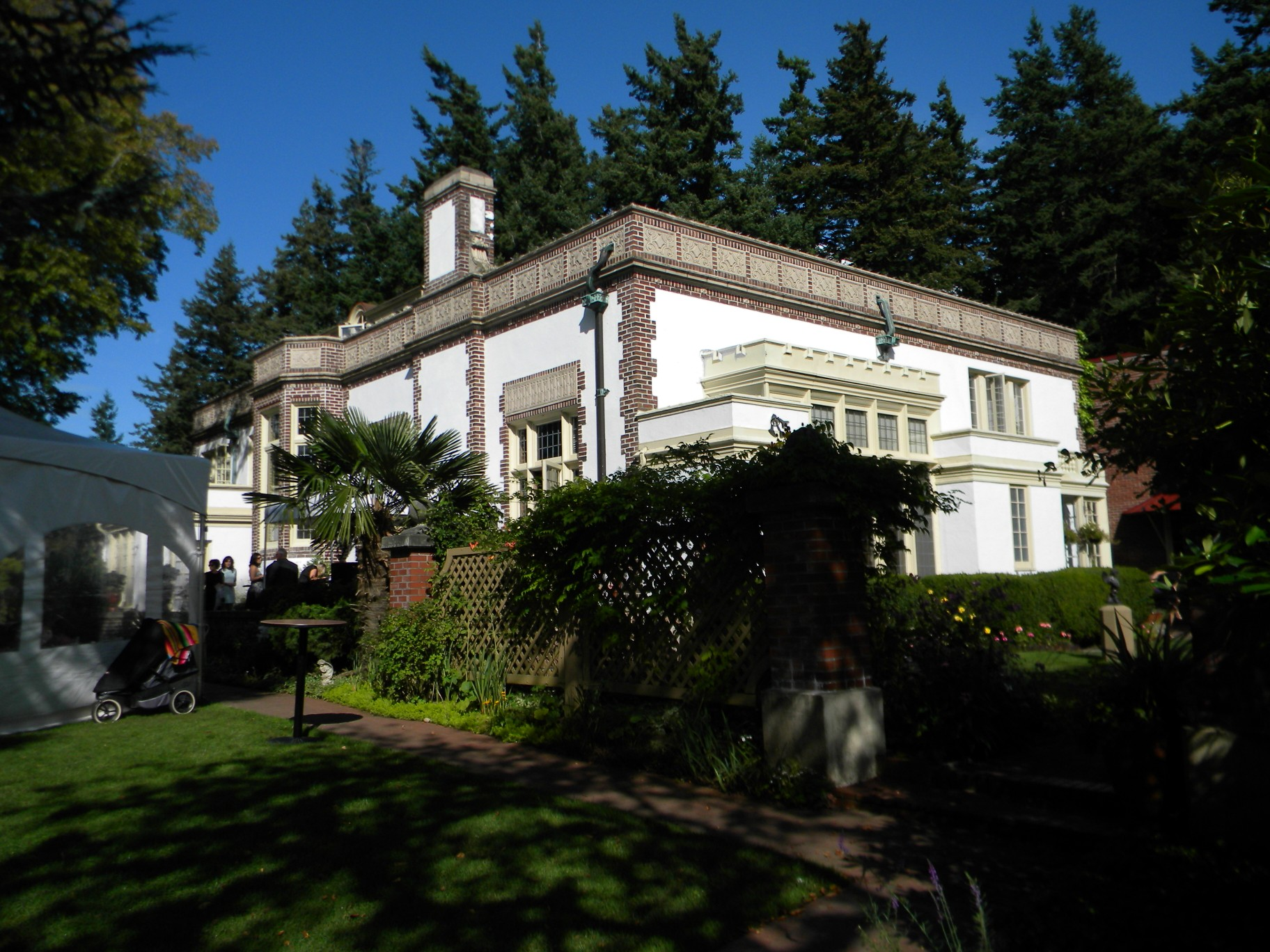

- Location within Washington (state)
- Location: Bellingham, Washington
- Coordinates: 48°42′43″N 122°30′26″W
- Built: 1915
- Architect: Bebb & Gould, Carl Gould
- NRHP reference No.: 75001880
- Added to NRHP: May 30, 1975

Lairmont Manor, also known as the Larrabee House, is a 1914 Italian Renaissance style home located in Bellingham, Washington. It was designed by Carl Gould, who is most known for designing the main library at the University of Washington. The home was built for C. X. Larrabee, who wanted one of the finest homes in the northwest, but he died before its completion. Currently, the home is used for weddings and other special occasions.
