= Jason Hirata =

American artist

- Born: 1986 (age 39–40); Seattle, Washington
- Known for: Visual artist

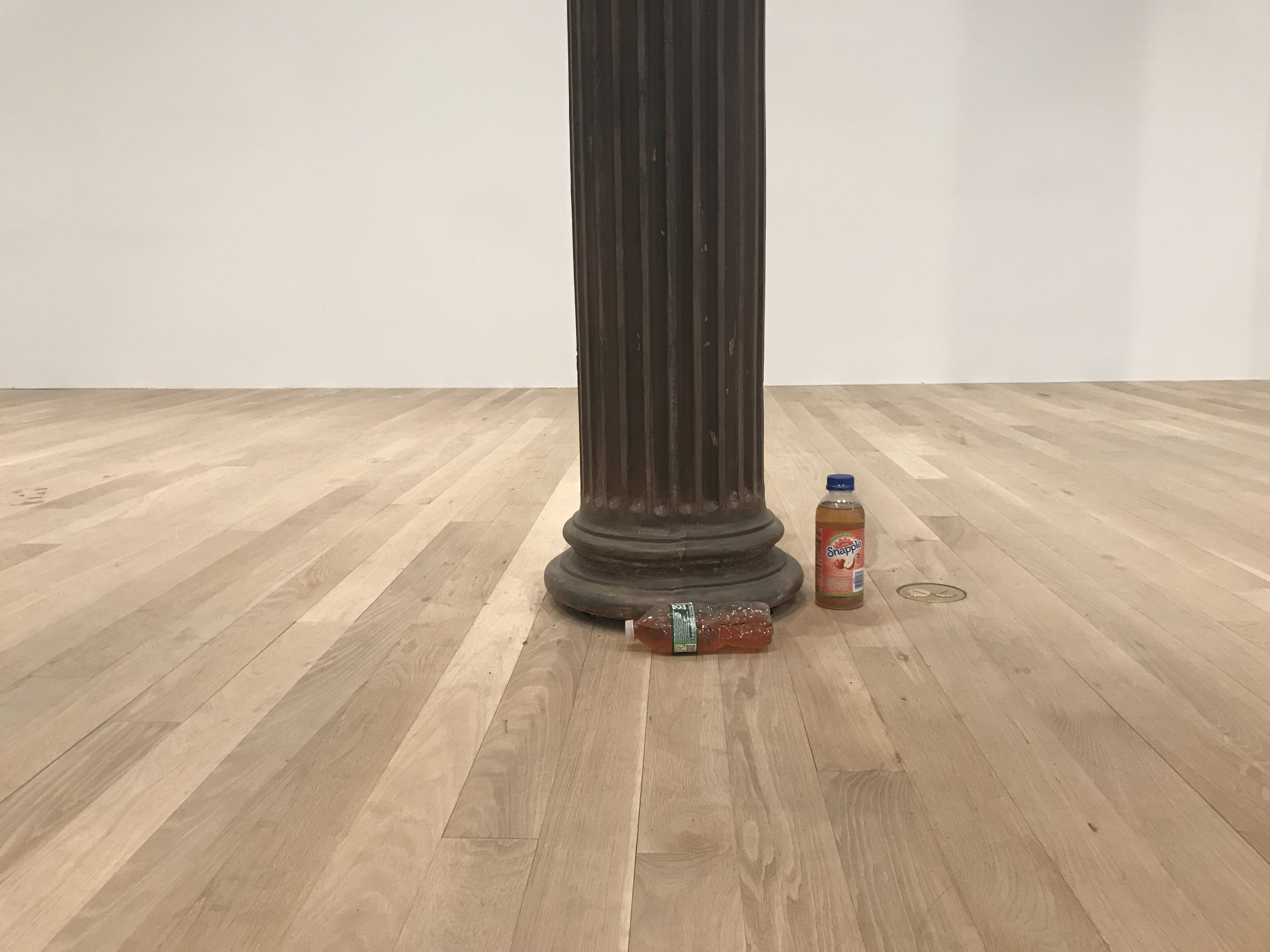
Hirata's work Why Not Lie? as it appeared at Artists Space, 2020

Jason Hirata (born 1986) is an artist who has shown internationally. Hirata's work can be described as institutional critique. He lives and works in Princeton, New Jersey.

== Life and education ==
Hirata was born in 1986 in Seattle, Washington. He received a BFA in photography from the University of Washington in 2009. In 2015 he received the Brink Prize for emerging artists working in the Cascadia region.

In addition to making his own artwork, Hirata works as a videographer for other artists.

== Exhibitions ==
Hirata was included in an exhibition at Artists' Space in 2020 where his work was unfavorably reviewed as a "slacker gesture". He had a solo show at 80WSE gallery in New York City in 2020 that consisted of work by Hannah Black, Adjua Greaves, Trajal Harrell, New Red Order & Jim Fletcherm Carissa Rodriguez and Hito Steyerl that Hirata had worked on and documentation of those artworks. Hirata considers the conveyance of the experience of being in the exhibition the work itself. Hirata has also shown at Svetlana, New York (2019); Veronica Project Space, Seattle (2019); Kunstverein Nuremberg (2019); Henry Art Gallery, Seattle (2016); and Muscle Beach, Portland (2016). He has also shown at Calicoon Fine Arts.

== Collaborators ==
Hirata frequently works collaboratively with or as a paid assistant to other artists. These artists include Levi Easterbrooks, Carissa Rodriguez, Hannah Black, Hito Steyerl, New Red Order.
