= Charles Bebb =

American architect

Charles Herbert Bebb (Birth Registered as "Herbert Charles Bebb"), (10 April 1862 (1856 on US Naturalisation) – 21 June 1942) was an American architect, who participated in two of the city of Seattle's most important partnerships, Bebb and Mendel (with Louis L. Mendel) from 1901 to 1914, and Bebb and Gould (with Carl F. Gould) from 1914 to 1939. Bebb was also important in the development of the architectural terra cotta industry in Washington State, and he was an early participant in the Washington State Chapter of the American Institute of Architects (predecessor to today's AIA Seattle Chapter).

== Biography ==
Eldest son of solicitor Henry Charles Lewis Bebb and Jessie Green (daughter of John "Paddy" Green of Evans Hotel, Covent Garden), Charles was born on 10 April 1862 at 11 Silchester Road, Kensington, London, England, where he spent his childhood. Notting Hill, London, England. He later claimed he was born 10 April 1856 on his US Naturalisation papers (8 December 1920). He was educated privately and he stated that he attended the University of Lausanne, and then studied at the School of Mines in London. In 1881, he was listed on the UK census as a Law Student living with his Aunt, Alice Green in Lee, London.

After a stint in South Africa as a railroad construction engineer, Bebb returned to London (17 February 1885) aboard R.M.S. "Athenian" and instead of going to Australia to join his father, he came to the United States as an Engineer (Philadelphia, Pennsylvania, 15 April 1885 aboard "British Prince") and lived as a boarder in Chicago, listing as a Surveyor. He said that he joined the Illinois Terra Cotta Lumber Company where he became involved in the development of fireproofing materials. In 1887, Bebb went to work for Chicago architects Adler and Sullivan as a superintending architect at 118 Dearborn Street (1887), Takoma Building (1889) and 1600 Auditorium Building (1890). He came to Seattle in 1891 (Griffith House) to superintend construction of the firm's Seattle Opera House, but the project did not go forward and Bebb returned to Chicago. While in Chicago, he married (21 November 1888) Virginia Rutler Bush (née Burns) adopting her son Joseph Crispia Bush (Bebb).

Bebb came permanently to Seattle in 1893 and went to work for the Denny Clay Company, which, with his assistance, began to produce architectural terra cotta. Bebb always saw himself as an architect, and he was an early member of the Washington State Chapter of the AIA, founded in 1894. By 1898, Bebb opened his own architectural practice. His early projects reflected the influence of Louis Sullivan in the use of terra cotta ornament with "Sullivanesque" designs.

In February 1901, Bebb joined with Louis L. Mendel to form Bebb and Mendel. Over the next thirteen years their firm was one of the leading architectural practices in Seattle, designing homes, hotels, office buildings and institutional, commercial and industrial structures. The Hoge Building (1909–11) was Seattle's tallest when it was completed, but it was passed three years later by the Smith Tower.

In early 1914, Bebb and Mendel dissolved their partnership. By mid-1914, Bebb had formed a new partnership, Bebb and Gould with Carl F. Gould. Their partnership agreement gave primary responsibility for management, engineering, specifications and construction to Bebb; planning and design, though the responsibility of both partners, were primarily allocated to Gould. The firm's early success in winning the commission for the University of Washington campus plan propelled it to prominence and Bebb and Gould won many significant institutional commissions over the next two decades.

Bebb was among the early members of the Washington State Chapter of the American Institute of Architects. He served as the Chapter president in 1902, 1903 and 1904. He was elected a Fellow of the AIA in 1919.

Bebb was never directly involved in architectural education, but several years after Carl F. Gould became head of the architecture program at the University of Washington, Bebb provided funds for an award for an annual student competition called the "Bebb Prize."

In 1924, when Bebb was 68, he began to gradually reduce his participation in the firm. However, he remained a partner with a share in the practice until Gould's unexpected death in 1939. Bebb carried on by taking draftsman John Paul Jones into partnership and renaming the firm Bebb and Jones. This partnership was short-lived as Bebb died in June 1942. Thereafter Jones continued the firm as Jones and Bindon with new partner Leonard Bindon.
