= Volunteer Park =

Volunteer Park may refer to:

- Volunteer Park, Armadale, a football ground in Armadale, Scotland
- Volunteer Park (Seattle), a park in the Capitol Hill neighborhood of Seattle, Washington State, USA
- Volunteer Park Conservatory, a conservatory/belvedere/glass walled summer house type structure in the Seattle park
- Volunteer Park Family Campground, a Recreation Vehicle (RV) park in Heiskell, Tennessee, USA
