= William Henry Seward Memorial =

- U.S. National Register of Historic Places
- Memorial in 2007
- Location: Florida, New York
- Nearest city: Middletown
- Coordinates: 41°20′00″N 74°21′27″W
- Built: 1930
- Architect: Daniel Chester French, Richard Henry Dana III
- Architectural style: Classical Revival
- NRHP reference No.: 99001489
- Added to NRHP: 1999

The William Henry Seward Memorial is located along Main Street (NY 17A/94) in downtown Florida, New York. It commemorates the life of Seward, a Florida native whose career in public service culminated with his tenure as Secretary of State under Abraham Lincoln, in which capacity he negotiated the purchase of Alaska from Russia.

It consists of a bronze bust of Seward by Daniel Chester French, who also sculpted Lincoln seated at the Lincoln Memorial in Washington, set in the middle of a small circular plaza with benches designed by Richard Henry Dana III. Just behind it is S. S. Seward Institute, the local secondary school, named after Seward's father. It was unveiled September 24, 1930, and restored in 2000 after being added to the National Register of Historic Places the year before.

In 2007 the memorial was vandalized. Seward's bust was shifted and one of the benches cracked.

== See also ==
- Public sculptures by Daniel Chester French
- Sites and works regarding William H. Seward
