= S. S. Seward Institute =

S.S. Seward Institute
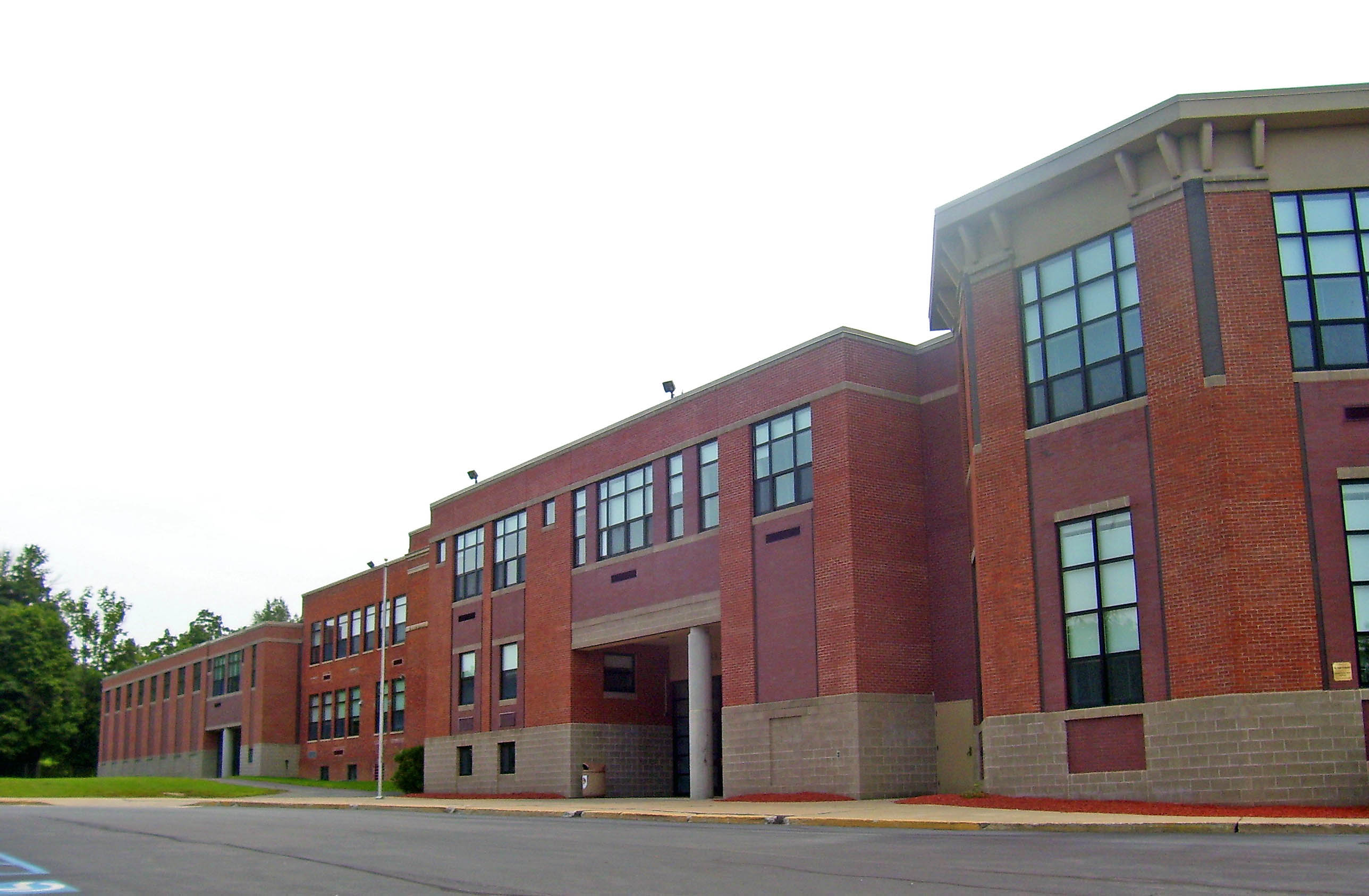

Location
- 52 North Main St. Florida, NY 10921
- Coordinates: 41°20′01″N 74°21′22″W

Information
- School type: Public, secondary school
- School district: Florida Union Free School District
- NCES School ID: 362532003497
- Principal: Michael Maesano
- Staff: 42.41
- Grades: 6-12
- Enrollment: 391(2024-2025)
- Colors: Blue and orange
- Team name: Spartans
- Communities served: Florida; Town of Goshen (part); Town of Warwick (part); Town of Chester (part)

S. S. Seward Institute is the secondary school in the Florida Union Free School District in Orange County, New York, United States. It is located along Main Street (NY 17A/94) in the village of Florida and referred to locally as just "Seward".

The student body consists of grades 6-12, drawn from Florida and surrounding portions of the towns of Chester, Goshen and Warwick.

The school gets its name from Samuel S. Seward, who settled in the region in the early 19th century and established both a medical practice and a mercantile business. Seward was also active in politics, serving as a member of the New York State Assembly in 1804 and, for many years, as a judge in the Orange County Court. In 1846, Seward started the school with an endowment of $20,000. One of his sons, William Henry Seward, attended one of the institute's predecessors for a time, and later began a career in public service that culminated in the purchase of Alaska while Secretary of State. A memorial to him is located on Main Street in front of the school.

== Extracurricular Activities ==
=== Athletics ===
As of 2025-26, Seward offers the following interscholastic athletic teams competing as the Spartans:

Sport	Season	Gender separation	Level	Co-operative
Soccer	Fall	Boys, Girls	Varsity, JV, Modified (Note: For students below the tenth-grade level, the NYSPHSAA has modified and adapted the sport to students in grades 7-8-9. It is considered equivalent to a middle school/junior high level in other states.)	
Cross Country	Fall		Varsity, Modified	
Volleyball	Fall	Girls	Varsity, JV, Modified	
Swimming	Fall	Girls	Varsity	with Goshen
Football	Fall		Varsity, Modified	with Chester Academy
Basketball	Winter	Boys, Girls	Varsity, JV, Modified	
Cheerleading	Winter		Varsity	
Swimming and Diving	Winter	Boys	Varsity	with Goshen
Indoor Track and Field	Winter		Varsity	with Chester Academy
Baseball	Spring		Varsity, JV, Modified	
Softball	Spring		Varsity, JV, Modified	
Lacrosse	Spring	Girls	Varsity	with Chester Academy
Outdoor Track and Field	Spring		Varsity	

The Spartans have won state titles in:

- 1986 - Soccer (Girls)
- 1987 - Soccer (Girls)
- 1999 - Baseball
- 2003 - Basketball (Boys)
- 2007 - Soccer (Girls)
- 2008 - Soccer (Girls)
