= Florida Union Free School District =

School district in the U.S. state of New York

- 51 N Main St Florida, New York, 10921-0757

District information
- Grades: Pre-K – 12
- Superintendent: Lisamarie Spindler
- School board: Rob Andrade, President; Lori Gorcsos, Vice President; Stephen Caldwell; John T. Redman; Robert Scheuermann
- NCES District ID: 3625320

Students and staff
- Students: 752 2021–2022 school year
- Teachers: 73.91 2021–2022 school year
- Staff: 57.50 2021–2022 school year
- Student–teacher ratio: 10.17

Other information
- Website: www.floridaufsd.org

Florida Union Free School District is a school district in Orange County in the U.S. state of New York. It includes the village of Florida and parts of the towns of Warwick and Goshen.

== History ==
The district was a party in the court case dealing called Walczak v. Florida Union Free School District dealing with free appropriate public education in which a court ruled that children are not entitled to the best education that money can buy; they are only entitled to an appropriate education.

Larry Leaven, a gay man in a same-sex marriage, became superintendent in 2021. He immediately began receiving homophobic harassment from community members, with members of the local chapter of Moms for Liberty being the most persistent. Of the three board members elected in May 2022 on a platform opposing "critical race theory", one was a Moms for Liberty member, one was married to a Moms for Liberty member, and one received funding from Moms for Liberty members. Leaven resigned his position in November 2022, though Leaven's supporters argue that he was forced out by the board.

== Schools ==
The district operates Golden Hill Elementary School, serving pre-K through 5th grade, and S.S. Seward Institute, serving 6th through 12th grades.
