= Culver Randel House and Mill =

Historic house in New York, United States

- U.S. National Register of Historic Places
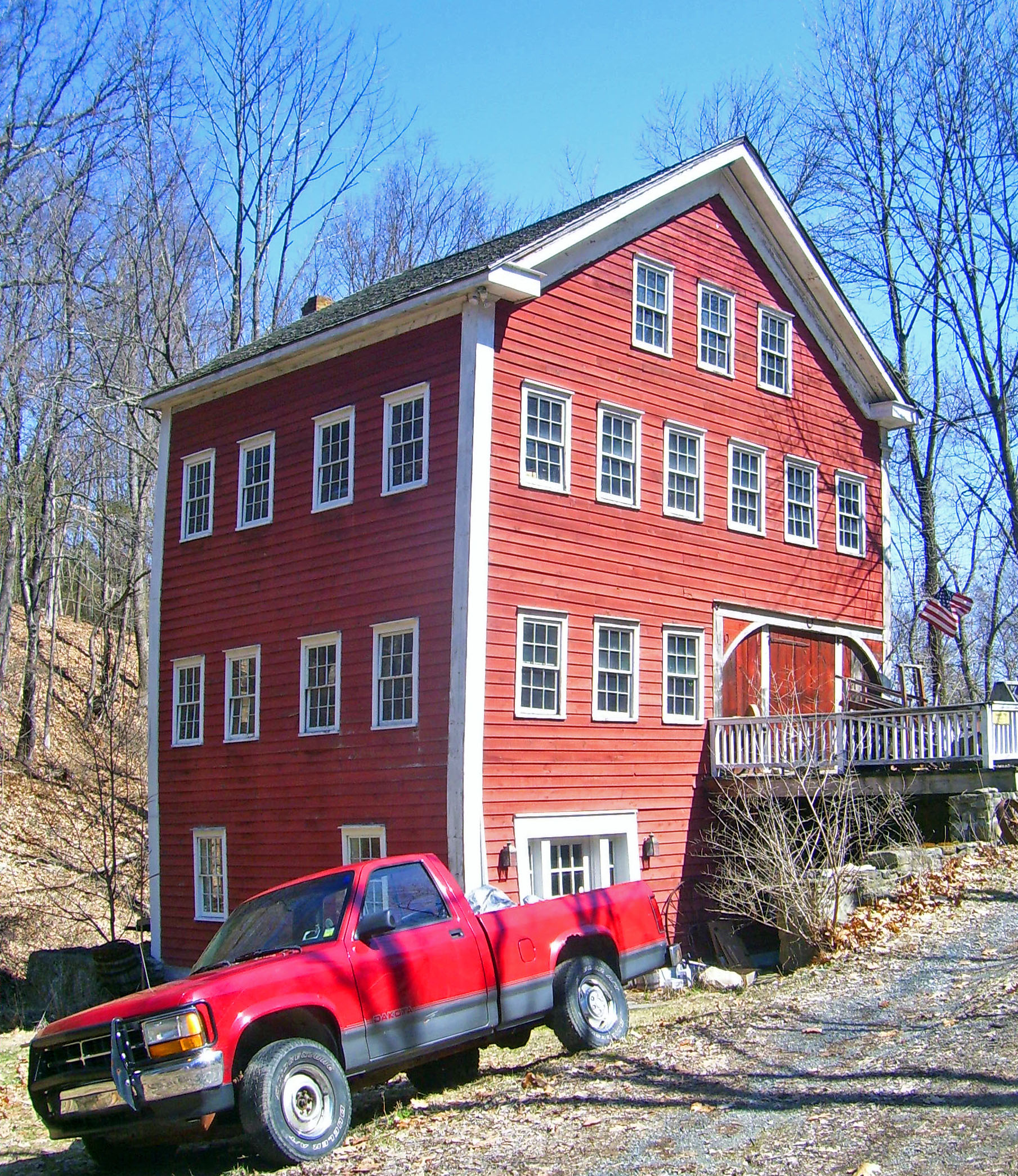
- South elevation and west profile of mill building, 2008
- Location: Florida, NY
- Nearest city: Middletown
- Coordinates: 41°20′28″N 74°21′07″W
- Area: 4 acres (1.6 ha)
- Built: ca. 1830 (mill); ca. 1850 (house)
- Architectural style: Italianate
- NRHP reference No.: 98000554
- Added to NRHP: 1998

The Culver Randel House and Mill is located along Randall Avenue (NY 94) and Browns Creek at the northern edge of the village of Florida, New York, United States. Culver built the mill around 1830 and the house 20 years later. The latter is an excellent example of the Picturesque aesthetic as applied to an Italianate house. Both buildings were added to the National Register of Historic Places in 1998.

== Buildings ==
The house and mill are the only buildings on the lot. A concrete slab bridge between them is not considered a contributing resource since it is relatively new compared to the house and mill.

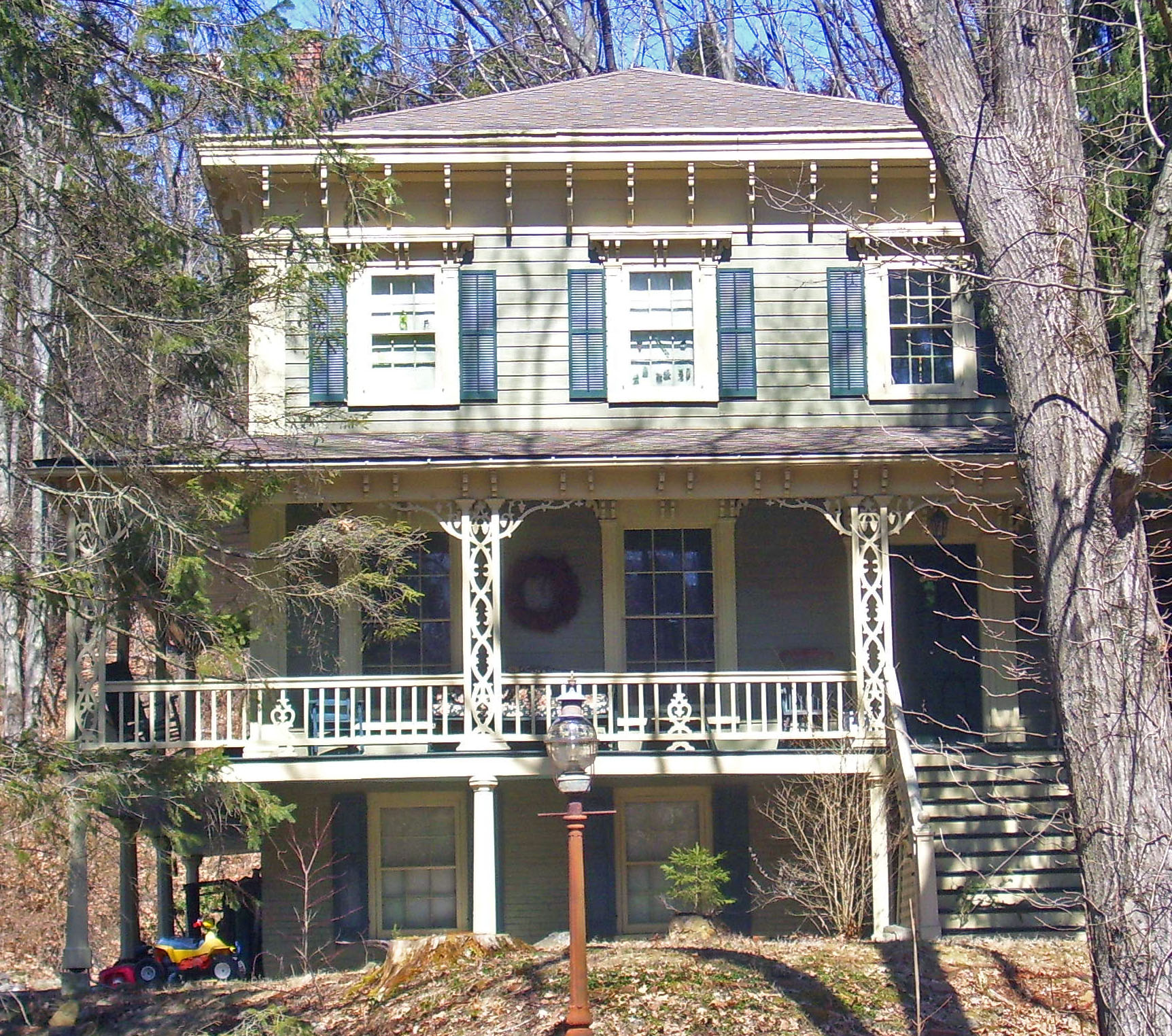
The house

=== House ===
The house is located on the slope across the creek from the road, and thus in the Town of Goshen. It is a two-story, three-by-four-bay frame house on a rubblestone foundation, with a low hipped roof. It appears to be three stories from the road because the basement is exposed on the south and east sides. A porch wraps around three sides, save the north. The clapboard siding is original.

The roofline is distinguished by a finely-molded cornice with brackets and wide eaves. The corners are trimmed with broad pilasters. Smaller pilasters and a cornice surround the entrance, where a wide door is divided into four arched Gothic panels.

Inside, the two parlors on either side of the main hall have marble fireplaces, plaster cornices, wooden architraves and wide plank flooring. Ornamentation continues in the upstairs bedrooms with wood molding in a lyre motif and other intricately detailed woodwork.

=== Mill ===
The mill is located to the southeast of the house, closer to the highway on the Florida side of the creek. It is a four-story, six-by-four bay frame building in a local rural vernacular style on a stone foundation. It has red wood clapboard siding and a gabled roof. The remnants of a chimney on the north side, facing the creek, are still visible. The original plank flooring and some of the machinery are still inside.

== History ==
The Randel family had been milling on the property since at least 1790. Records show that many local commodities were milled at the site: wood, wool and flour, as well as millwork for home furniture.

Culver Randel took over the property around the middle of the 19th century. He had spent some time apprenticing with a piano manufacturer in New York City as a younger man, and decided to give that business a try in his hometown. The mill produced pianos through his retirement in 1870. The new house he built for his own family reflected the tastes of the time found in pattern books by Andrew Jackson Downing and Calvert Vaux. Their designs were for country houses that would harmonize with nature. Randel's is considered an outstanding example of the contemporary Picturesque movement to a popular style of the day.

There have been very few additions or alterations to either property. East and west additions to the mill were removed in the mid-20th century, and both it and the house were extensively restored in the 1990s prior to its nomination for the NRHP.
