= Thomas Burke Monument =

Monument in Seattle, Washington, U.S.

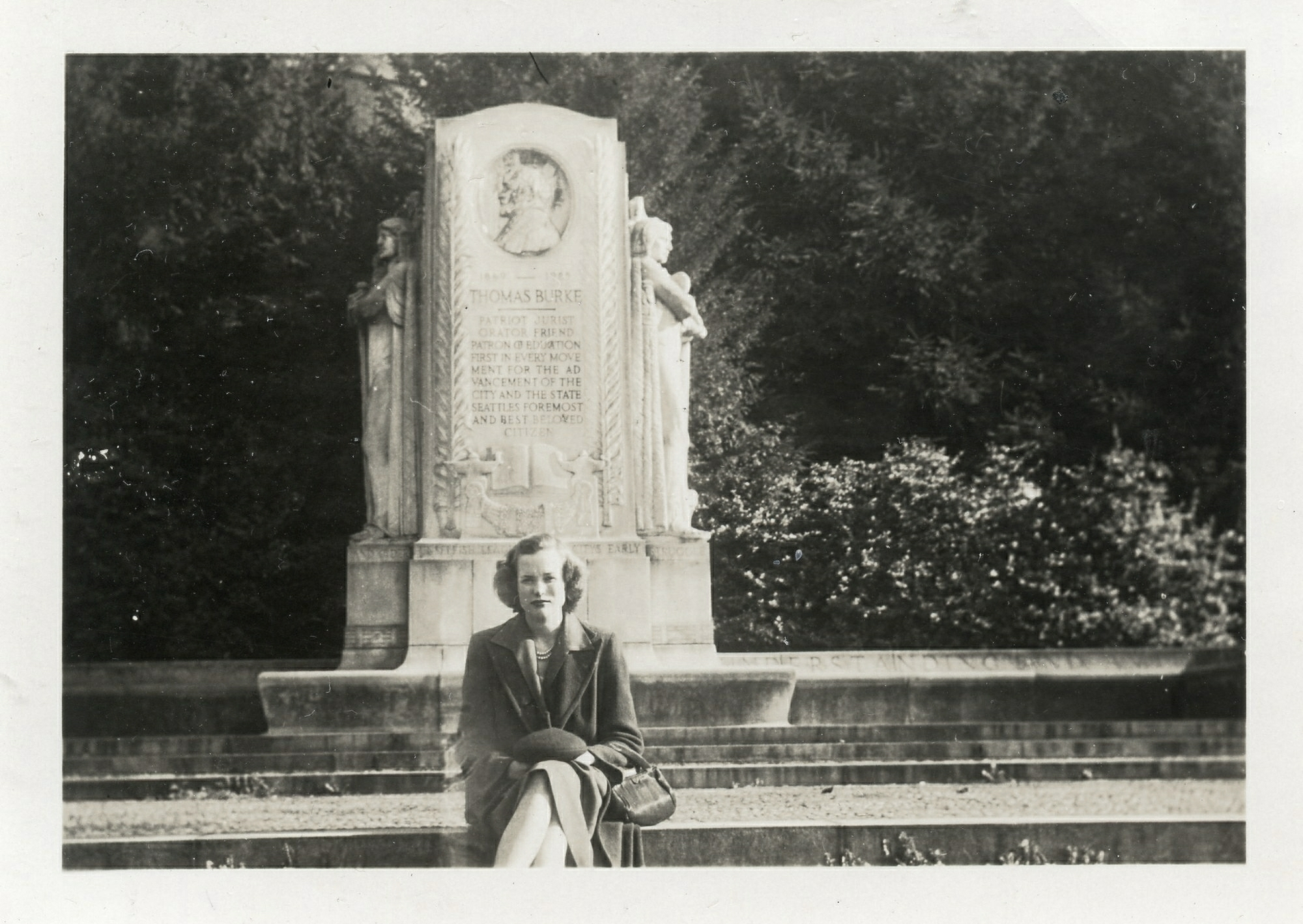
- The monument c. 1935
- Artist: Hermon Atkins MacNeil
- Year: 1929
- Location: Seattle, Washington, U.S.
- 47.629283°N 122.315253°W

The Thomas Burke Monument, also known as Judge Thomas Burke, is a 1929 outdoor sculpture commemorating Thomas Burke by Hermon Atkins MacNeil, located in Volunteer Park, in Seattle's Capitol Hill neighborhood, in the U.S. state of Washington. The monument, which is made of granite, marble, and bronze, was dedicated in 1930. It is part of the Seattle Office of Arts & Culture.

== See also ==
- 1929 in art
