= Statue of William H. Seward (New York City) =

Statue of William H. Seward in Manhattan, New York, U.S.

William Henry Seward
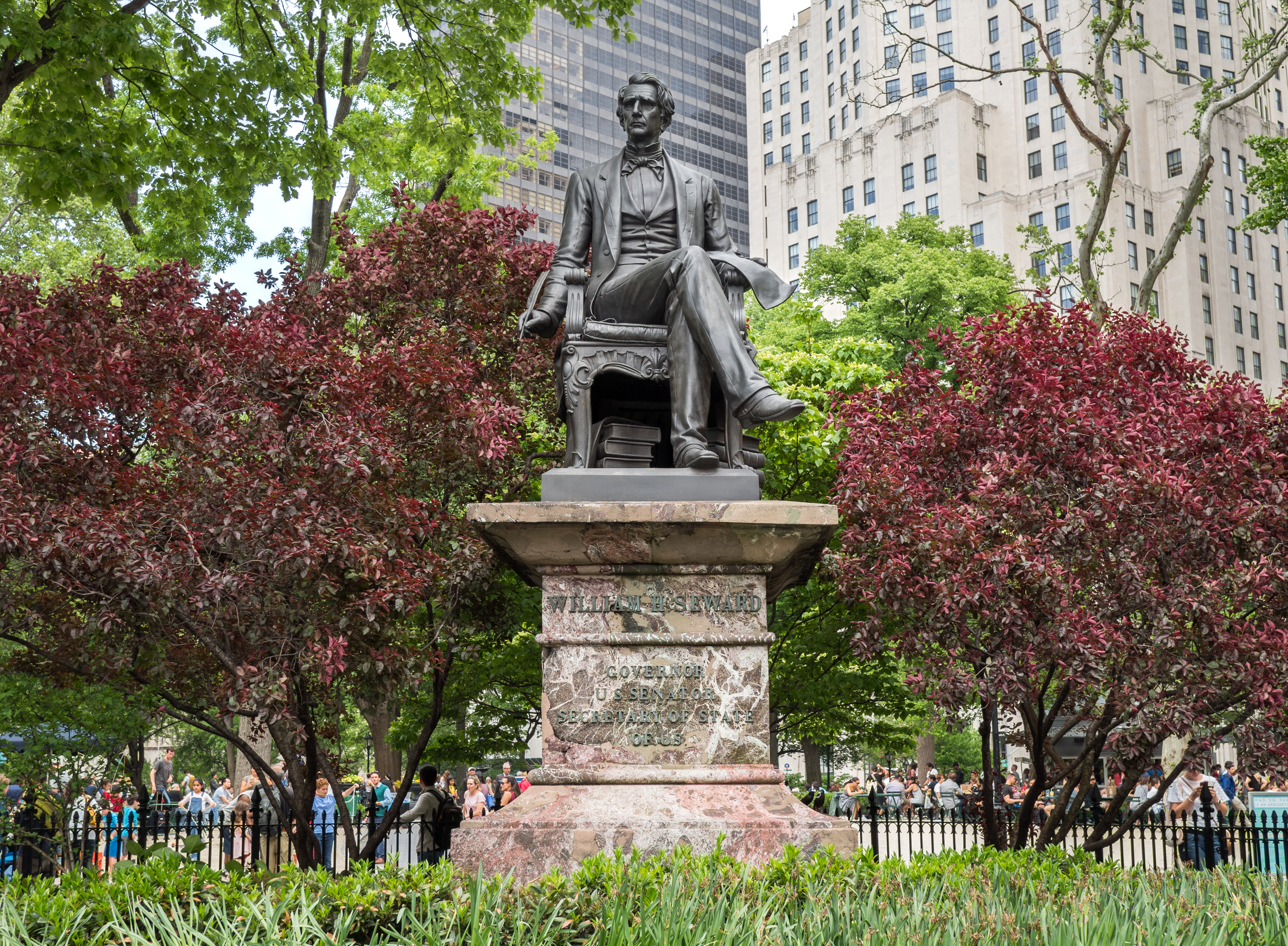
- The sculpture in 2018
- Artist: Randolph Rogers
- Year: 1876
- Type: Sculpture
- Medium: Bronze
- Subject: William H. Seward
- Location: New York City, New York, United States; 40.74149°N 73.98880°W

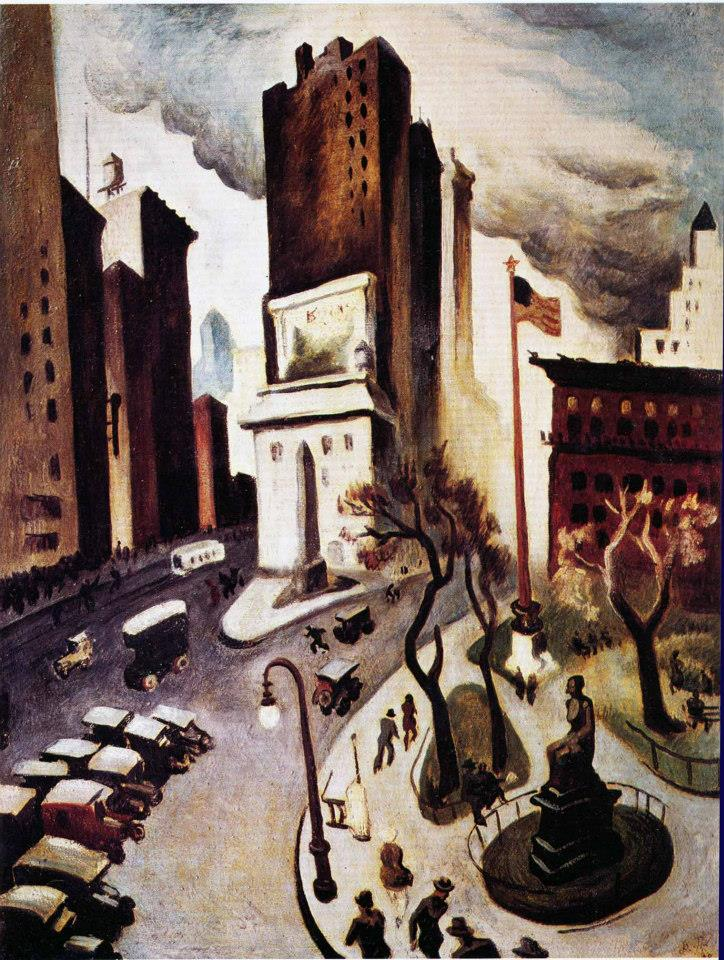
The Seward statue is portrayed in a 1920 painting by Thomas Hart Benton

William Henry Seward is an outdoor bronze sculpture of William H. Seward by artist Randolph Rogers, located in Madison Square in Manhattan, New York. Dedicated on September 27, 1876, it believed to be the city's first monument depicting a New York resident. The portrait statue is set on a red Levante marble pedestal.

== See also ==
- Sites and works regarding William H. Seward
