= Statue of William H. Seward (Seattle) =

Statue in Seattle, Washington, U.S.

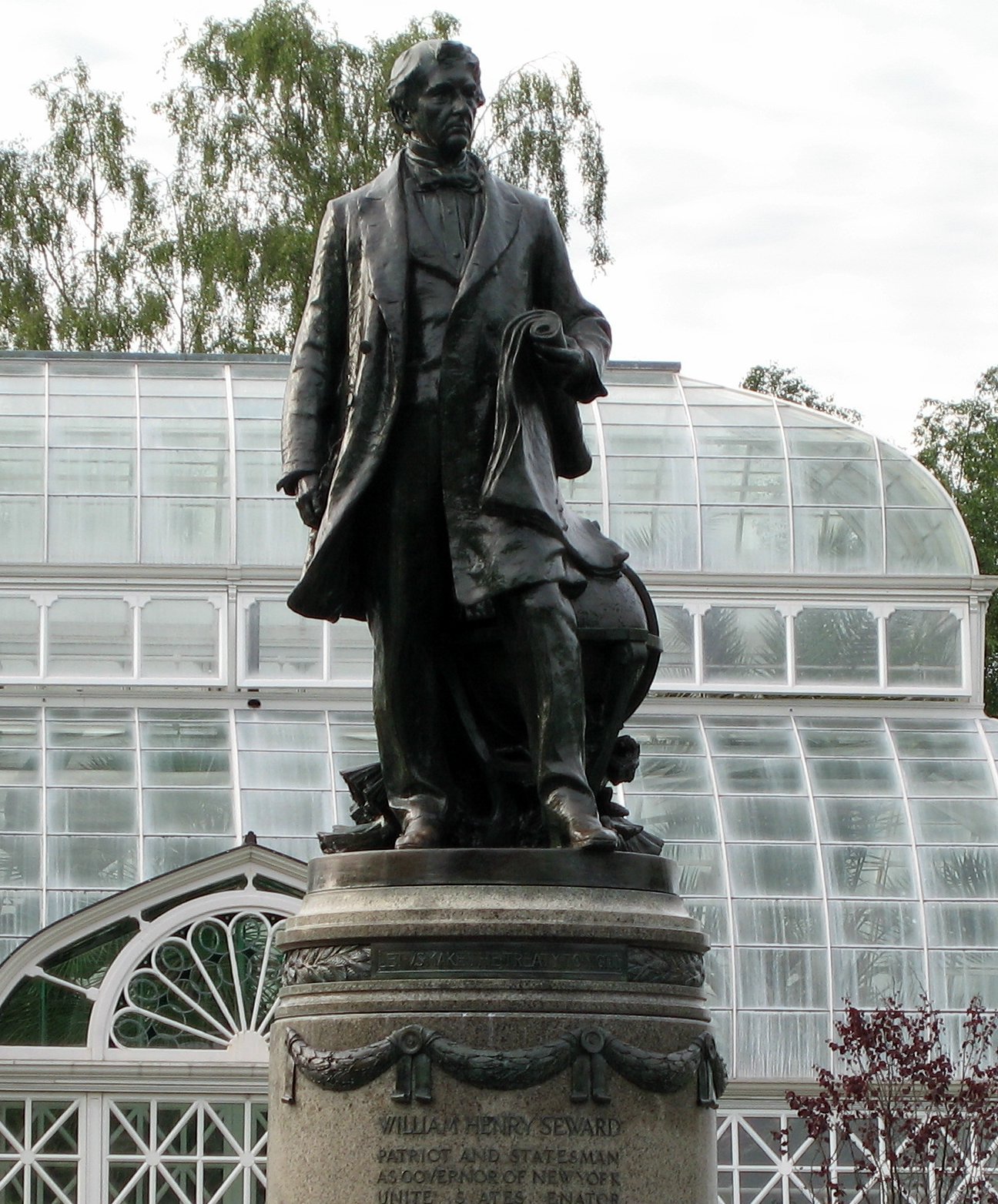
- The sculpture in 2006
- Year: 1909
- Type: Sculpture
- Medium: Bronze
- Subject: William H. Seward
- Location: Seattle, Washington, United States; 47.63186°N 122.31573°W

William Henry Seward, also known as Let Us Make the Treaty Tonight, the Monument to William H. Seward, and William H. Seward, is an outdoor bronze sculpture of William H. Seward by Richard Brooks, located in Volunteer Park in Seattle, Washington, United States. The statue was unveiled at the Alaska–Yukon–Pacific Exposition in 1909 and relocated to the park the following year. It cost $15,000 and was funded by private donors.

== See also ==
- Sites and works regarding William H. Seward
