= Volunteer Park Conservatory =

Botanical garden and conservatory in Seattle, Washington, USA

Coordinates: 47.63210°N 122.31574°W

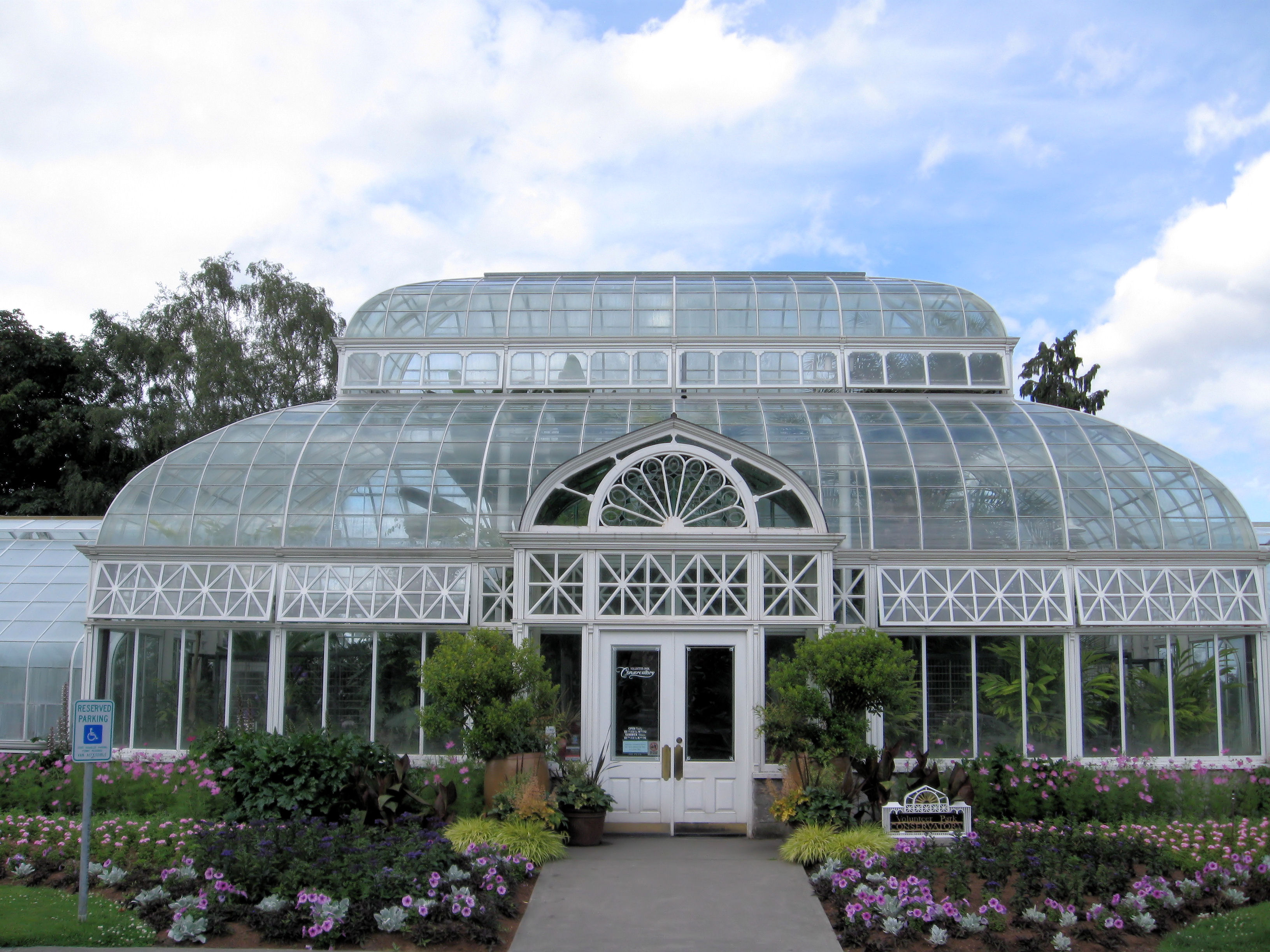
The conservatory

The Volunteer Park Conservatory is a botanical garden, conservatory, and Seattle landmark located in Seattle, Washington at the north end of Volunteer Park on Capitol Hill.

Made up of 3,426 glass panes fit into a wood and iron framework, this Victorian-style greenhouse structure is modeled on London's Crystal Palace. Inside, the Volunteer Park Conservatory is divided into five display houses: bromeliads, ferns, palms, seasonal, and cacti/succulents.

== Collections and programs ==
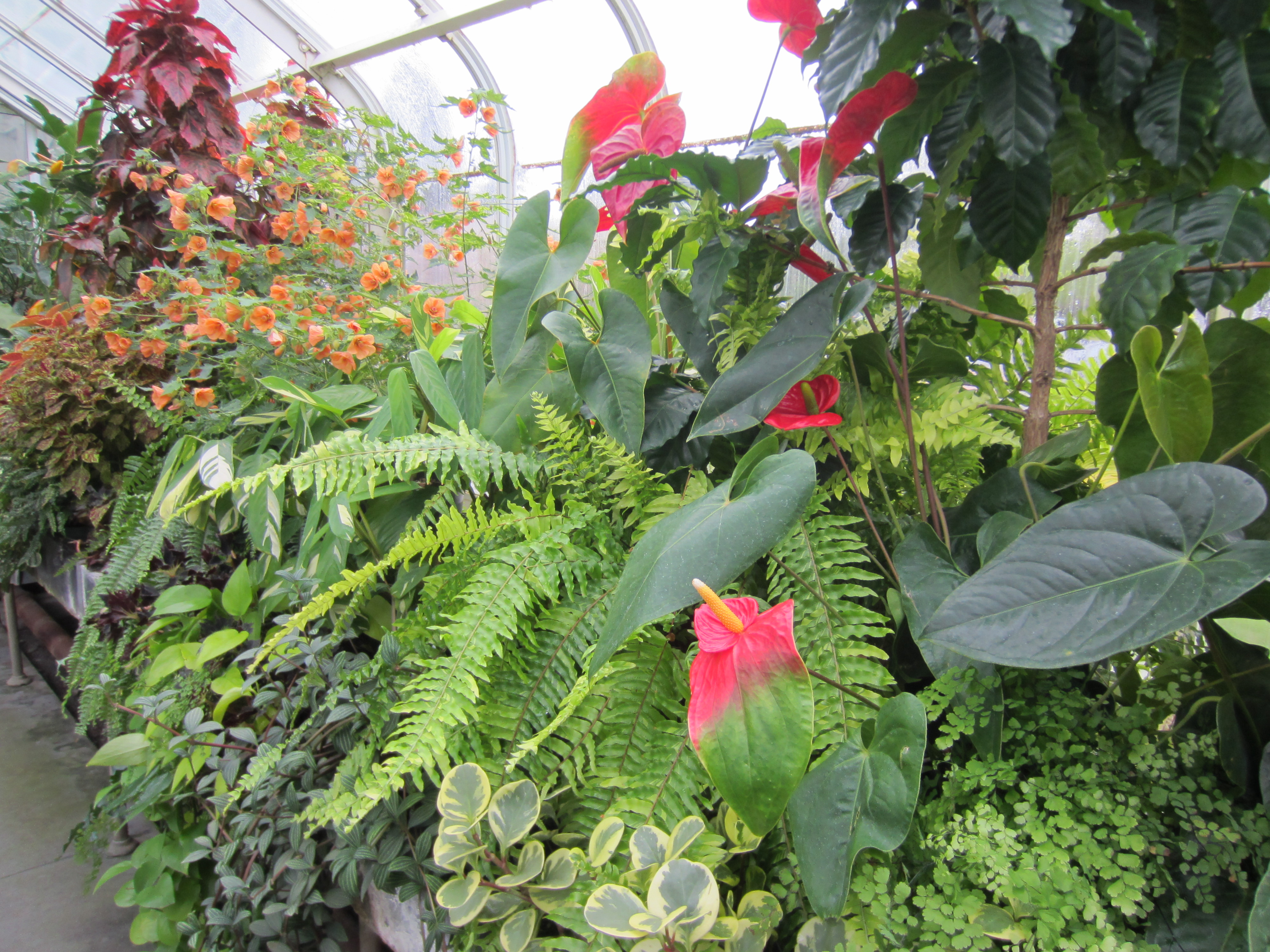
Interior, 2014

The conservatory built up its specialty plant collections through donations from individuals. Between its glass ceilings and walls, the conservatory displays thousands of living specimens for public viewing, while thousands of additional specimens are cultivated in the adjacent greenhouses. Four of the conservatory's five display houses – bromeliad, fern, palm, and cacti and succulents – feature plants from a single plant primarily along with other accent plants. A fifth house, the seasonal house, features different plants based on the season.

=== Display houses ===
==== Bromeliad House ====
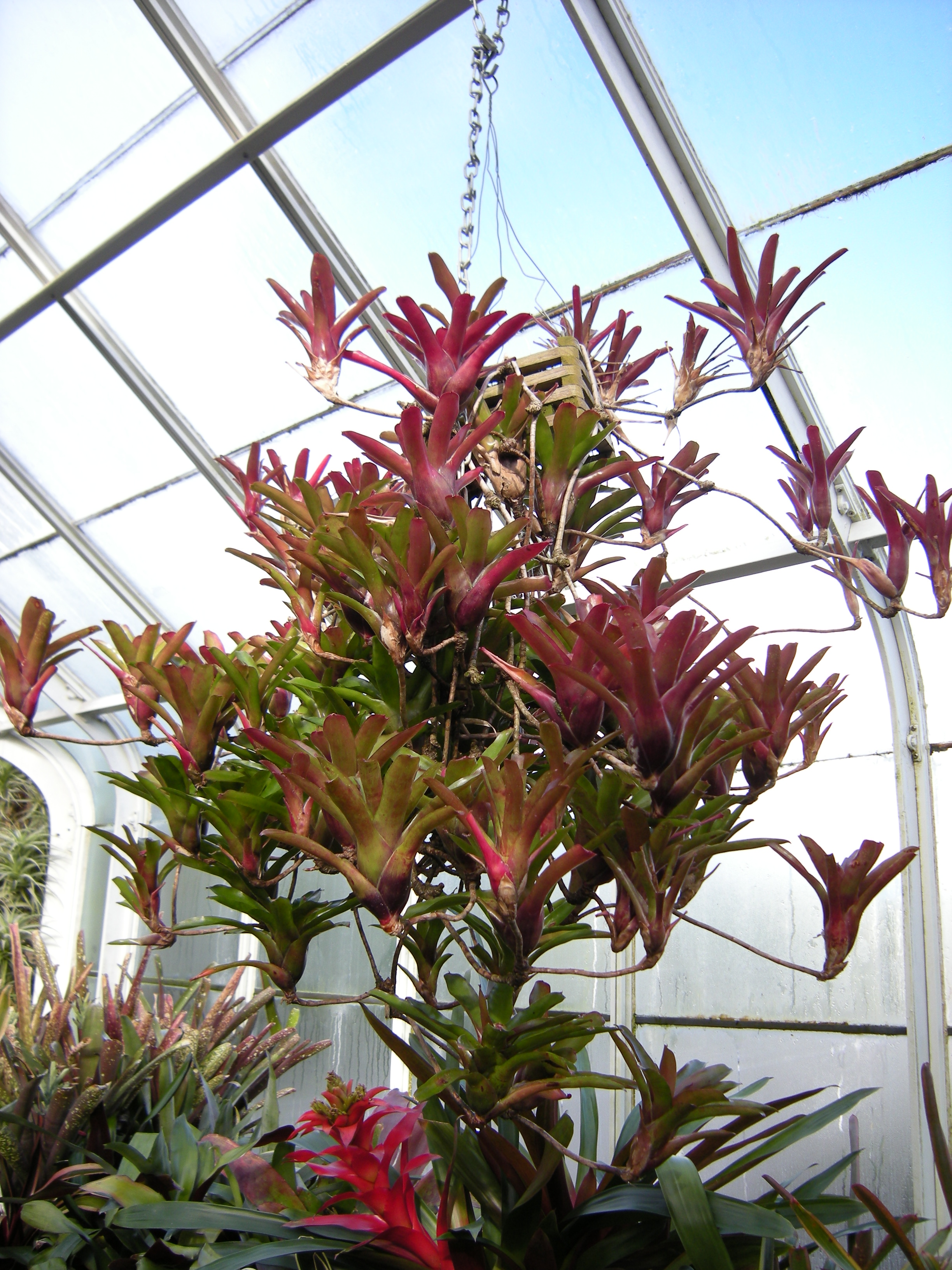
Tillandsia neoregelia, 2009

The name "bromeliad" refers to plants in the family Bromeliaceae. More than 2,400 bromeliad species grow worldwide. Bromeliads are commonly epiphytes, which grow by attaching themselves to another surface such as a branch or rock. The conservatory's Bromeliad House features its epiphytes on a special iron display tree holding dozens of different Tillandsia species. The conservatory also displays terrestrial species of the bromeliad family, such as the pineapple (Ananas comosus).

==== Fern House ====
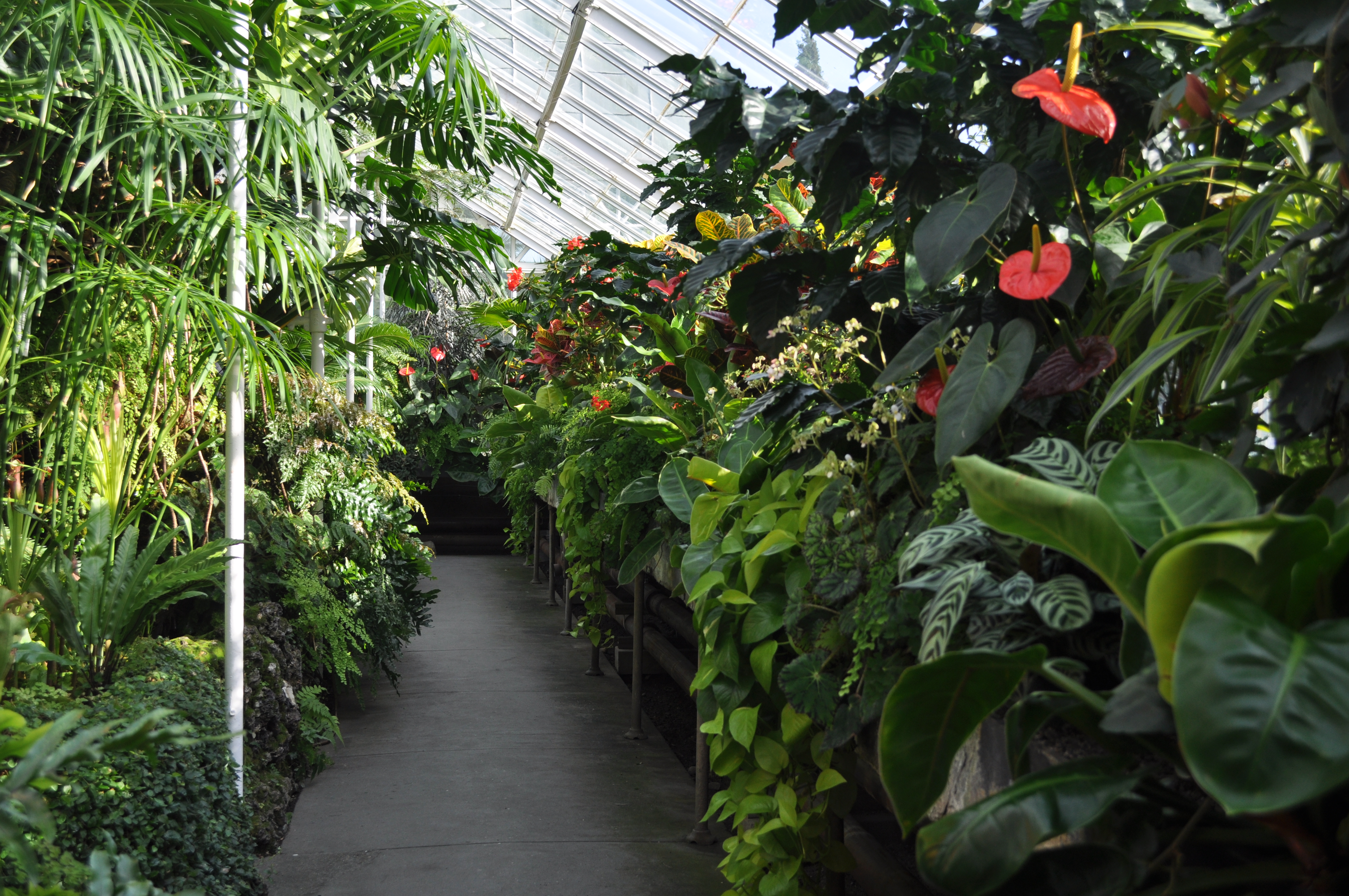
The Fern House

A fern is any plant classified in the phylum or division Pteridophyta (also known as Filicophyta), a group composed of roughly 20,000 species. The conservatory's collection features several cycads. Other featured plants in the Fern House include a Mexican breadfruit (Monstera deliciosa) and tropical flowers including passionflower (Passiflora sp.) and hibiscus. This house also features bog gardens with a collection of carnivorous plants including Venus fly traps (Dionaea muscipula), sundews (Drosera sp), pitcher plants (Sarracenia sp).

==== Seasonal House ====
This house within the conservatory does not feature a single plant family but is instead changed over completely six times per year. The featured flowers for each change include poinsettias, mums, late winter flowers, azaleas, early spring flowers, hydrangeas, and fuchsias.

==== Palm House ====
The 2,500 species of the palm family, Arecaceae, are typically found in tropic and subtropic regions. Notable palms in the conservatory's collection include the Windmill Palm (Trachycarpus fortunei), donated by Hiram Chittenden Locks circa 1953. A featured Sago Palm (Cycas revoluta, not a true palm, but a member of the Cyadaceae), was about 80 years old in 2009. In addition to palms, cycads, and orchids, visitors will find banana (Musa), Bird of Paradise (Strelitzia), Anthurium and ginger (Zingiberaceae) in this house.

The conservatory's orchid collection, which began as a gift from Mrs. Anna H. Clise in 1921, is also found in the Palm House. Orchids are a large and diverse flowering plant family composed of more than 20,000 species. The conservatory's collection includes representatives of the largest genera – Bulbophyllum, Epidendrum, and Dendrobium – as well as commonly cultivated genera such as Cattleya and Phalaenopsis. Transporting endangered orchids is prohibited by the Convention of International Trade of Endangered Species (CITES) and many confiscated specimens have been added to the conservatory collection over the years.

==== Cacti and Succulent House ====
Members of the spine plant family Cactaceae, native to the Americas, are known as cacti or cactuses. All cacti are succulents – plants that have adapted to arid climate or soil conditions and store water in their leaves, stems, and/or roots – but not all succulents are cacti. The conservatory's collection includes cacti genera such as Opuntia, as well as succulents from other genera such as Pachypodium, Haworthia, Agave, Aloe, and Euphorbia. Grown from a cutting taken in 1916, the Jade Tree (Crassula argentea) is one of the oldest plants in the conservatory.

=== Art installations ===
Several sculptural features and artworks adorn the conservatory.

The ornate beveled glass lunette window found just above the entry is original to 1912. In 1981, the conservatory added a hand-blown and stained green glass canopy designed by Richard Spaulding and entitled “Homage in Green” to the entry vestibule. Additional green glass pieces, also designed by Spaulding, were added in 1982 and 1995. The lunette or "peacock window" over the main entry is the only original wood and glass piece remaining from 1912 after two renovations. It was restored in 2000.

A wrought iron display tree designed by Randy Benson and crafted by local iron artists holds tillandsias in the bromeliad house.

=== Audience ===
More than 150,000 people visit the Conservatory annually.

=== Public programs ===
The Conservatory is open to the public Tuesday through Sunday, 10 am to 4 pm. Docents offer tours providing information on Conservatory plant collections, architectural history, plant acquisition and production, physical facility operation, and behind-the-scenes news.

== History ==
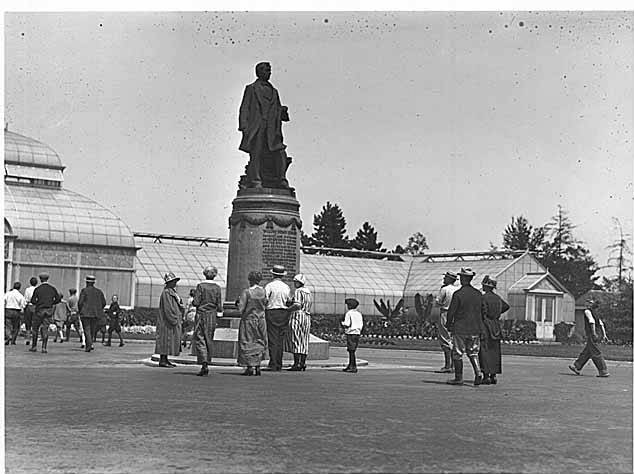
The statue of William Henry Seward and Volunteer Park Conservatory c. 1925

In 1878, the City of Seattle spent $2,000 to acquire approximately 45 acres (180,000 m^{2}) on north Capitol Hill from a sawmill engineer. Originally named City Park, it was renamed Volunteer Park in 1901 to honor the volunteers who served in the Spanish–American War. From 1904, this acreage was improved using plans designed by the Olmsted Brothers, with John Charles Olmsted as the principal designer for this project

The conservatory was among the earliest additions to City/Volunteer Park. After the project was proposed in 1893, the City of Seattle purchased the conservatory design and framework from the Hitchings Company of New York. The conservatory is a Victorian-style greenhouse modeled on London's Crystal Palace. The City's Parks Department staff erected the building, completing the work in 1912. In 1922, the conservatory added growing greenhouses to grow and propagate plants.

By 1978, the Conservatory's glass panes and framework of wood and iron had deteriorated and, during high winds, the building was forced to close. Citizens campaigned to restore the physical shell of the Conservatory. As a result of this effort, the Friends of the Conservatory (FOC) became established as a non-profit organization in 1980. Working in partnership with the Seattle Department of Parks and Recreation, the FOC sponsored an architectural restoration of the Conservatory that took place between 1980 and 1985. In 2003, a Gift Shop/Resource Center opened. In 2004, the FOC led a successful community drive against a proposed mandatory $5 admissions fee.

In 2005, 2008, and 2014, the Conservatory witnessed the rare flowering of a corpse flower (Amorphophallus titanum). Seattle mayor Ed Murray honored 2014 blooming by proclaiming "Corpse Flower Week". Not only are corpse flowers quite large plants, but they are also only likely to bloom two to three times within their 40-year life spans. Before it bloomed on July 27, 2008, the specimen at the Volunteer Park Conservatory, nicknamed Waldo, had grown to a size of 47½ inches tall, 30 inches wide, and 52½ inches long.

== Organizational structure ==
The Volunteer Park Conservatory is owned by the City of Seattle and administered by its Department of Parks and Recreation, as it has been since its inception. The conservatory is also a registered United States Fish and Wildlife Service repository for confiscated plants. As such, it acquires, quarantines, and later displays restricted orchids, cycads, and other plants seized by USFW agents.

As of 2017, the conservatory employs 6 staff people – 2 senior gardeners, 2 gardeners, and 2 greeters – to maintain the collections and the facilities. Public programs are largely supported by the Friends of the Conservatory.

The Friends of the Conservatory's mission, in cooperation with the Seattle Department of Parks and Recreation, is "to support and advocate for the Conservatory by encouraging preservation, public participation, and education with respect to the Conservatory and its plant collections." The Friends of the Conservatory (FOC) was established in 1980.

The FOC provides both financial and educational support to the Volunteer Park Conservatory. Its efforts include funding descriptive tour materials and environmental education, helping to build the Conservatory's orchid collection, and contributing to the Plant Acquisition Fund. The FOC also assists the conservatory in organizing and hosting events, such as open houses and plant sales. Over 100 volunteers provide over 2,500 hours of service to the conservatory annually.

== See also ==
- List of botanical gardens in the United States
