= Chester Academy =

Public secondary school in Chester, New York, United States

Coordinates: 41°22′8″N 74°16′38″W

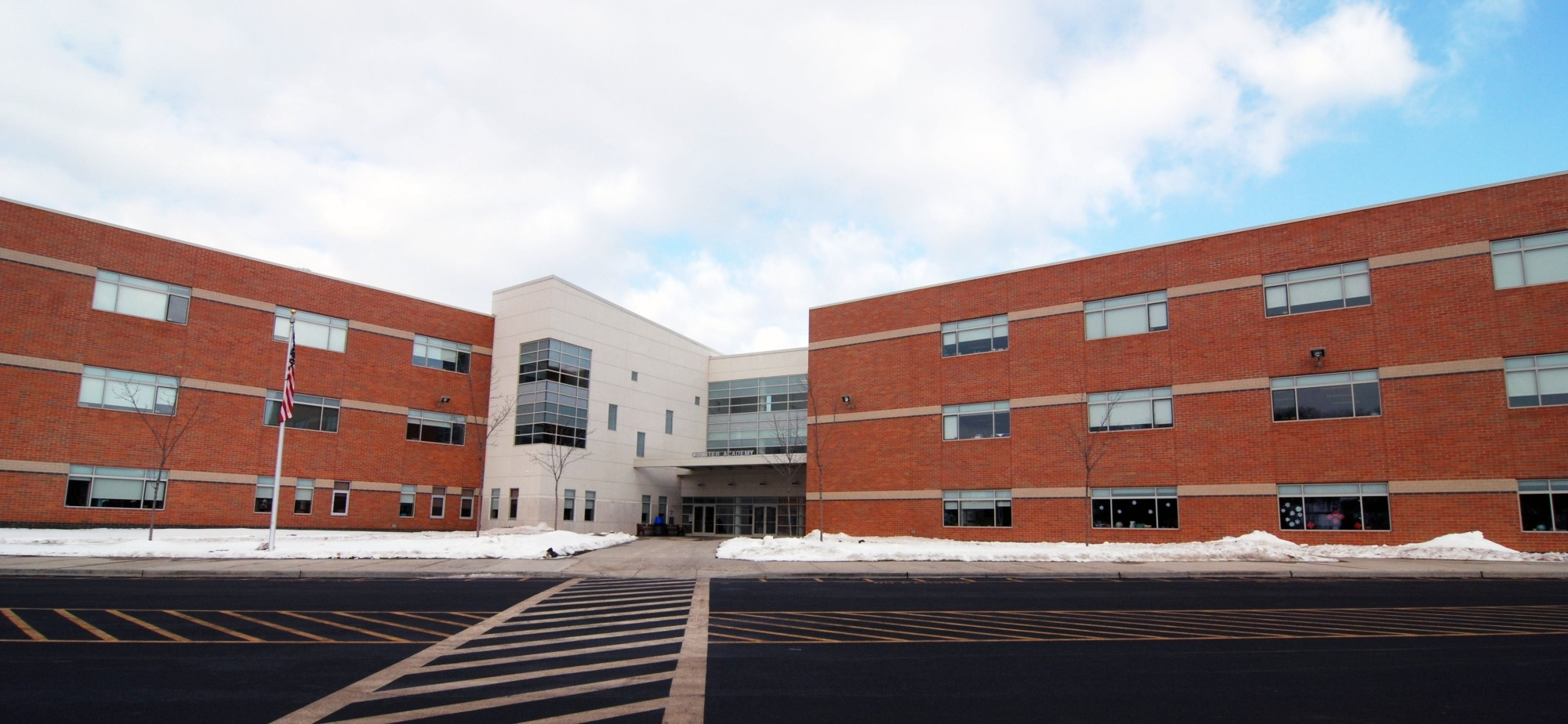

Location
- 64 Hambletonian Avenue; Chester, Orange County, New York 10918; United States

Information
- School type: Public secondary school, high school
- Motto: "Excellence in Education"
- Established: 2004
- School district: Chester Union Free School District
- Superintendent: Denis Petrilak
- Principal: John Flanagan
- Grades: 6 - 12
- Colors: Orange and blue
- Mascot: Hambletonian
- Phone Number: 845-469-2231
- Assistant Principal: Rolando Aguliar
- Website: ca.chesterufsd.org

Chester Academy is a public secondary school located in Chester, New York, United States. Their mascot is the Hambletonian, after Hambletonian 10, a famed harness racing horse that is an ancestor of nearly every Standardbred horse in the United States. The school's colors are orange and blue. Chester Academy is a recently built school, with construction starting in 2002. Students moved into the school from Chester Junior/Senior High School, located about three-quarters of a mile away, in 2004.

There are three floors. The school offers a variety of sports at different levels: football, soccer, baseball, cheerleading, Wrestling and basketball at varsity and junior varsity levels, as well as a varsity track and cross country team. They also have volleyball as of 2015. In 2012, Chester Academy was the first school in Hudson Valley to send home 1-to-1 Google Chromebooks with its students under a plan from K-12 Director of Instruction & Technology / Data Administrator Edward A. Spence. In 2014, Chester UFSD was awards an "Innovative Schools" annual award from NYSSBA. The district has since had ten different school districts visit Chester Academy to share best practices with Mr. Spence, teachers and students regarding their award-winning 1-to-1 Chromebook Instruction Plan. Take-home 1-to-1 Chromebooks have since become the de facto standard for school districts.

The name of the school changed from Chester Jr/Sr High School to Chester Academy in May 2004 when students and faculty were moved from the original Maple Avenue school building to the new building on Hambletonian Avenue. Chester Jr/Sr High School housed students grades 7–12, and was changed to accommodate students grades 6–12 in the Chester Academy. The school building is separated into a junior high school wing and a high school wing. Chester Academy is also home to an Orange-Ulster BOCES Special Education wing.

One memorable event in the school's history was a school shooting scare in 2018. A BOCES student made a 911 call claiming that a man with a gun was in the building. What ensued was a three-hour lockdown as SWAT members swept each room of the building. Other schools in the area had a lockout, and once the truth was uncovered, no charges were pressed on the student.

== Primary Feeder Schools ==
- Chester Elementary School
- Greenwood Lake
