= Volunteer Park (Seattle) =

Park in Seattle, Washington, U.S.

Coordinates: 47°37′49.5″N 122°18′56.1″W

- U.S. National Register of Historic Places
- U.S. Historic district
- Seattle Landmark
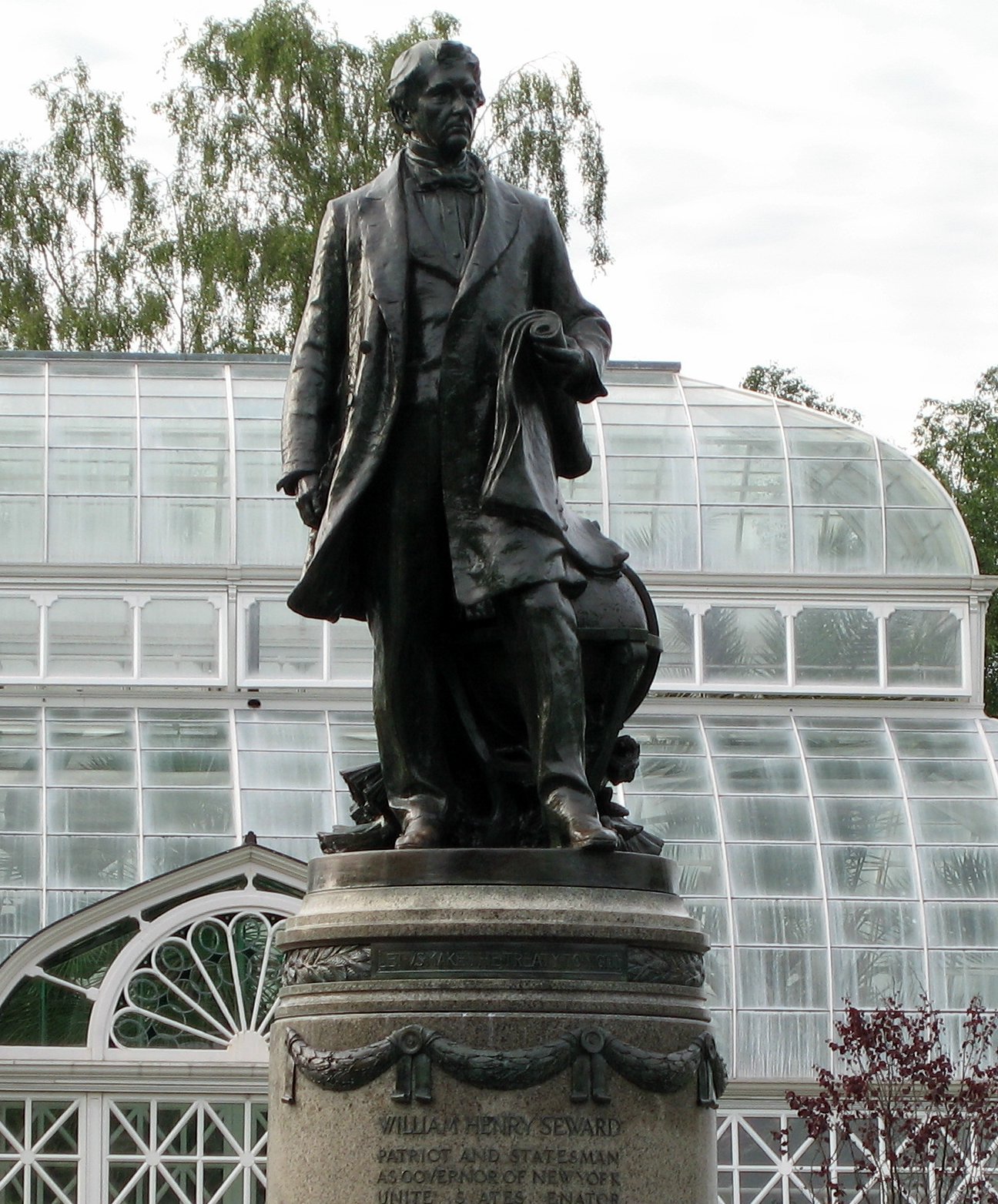
- The statue of William H. Seward in front of the Volunteer Park Conservatory
- Interactive map of Volunteer Park
- Location: Between E. Prospect and E. Galer Sts., and Federal and 15th Aves. E., Seattle, Washington, U.S.
- Area: 48.4 acres (19.6 ha)
- Built: 1901
- Architect: Olmsted Brothers; Bebb & Gould
- Architectural style: Moderne (art museum)
- NRHP reference No.: 76001894

Significant dates
- Added to NRHP: May 3, 1976
- Designated SEATL: November 2011

Volunteer Park is a 48.3-acre (19.5 ha) park in the Capitol Hill neighborhood of Seattle, Washington, United States.

== History ==
Volunteer Park was acquired by the city of Seattle in 1876 from J.M. Colman at a cost of $2,000. When Seattle Cemetery became Denny Park in 1884, the bodies interred there were moved to Washelli Cemetery, at the site of the future park. It soon became apparent that the land would be better suited to park use and the bodies were moved once again, this time to Lake View Cemetery; the park was renamed Lake View Park. This caused considerable confusion, leading to another renaming to City Park in 1887. J. Willis Sayre, a Seattle theatre critic, journalist and historian who had fought in the Spanish–American War, actively lobbied local officials to rename it once again - as Volunteer Park, to honor the volunteers who served in the war.

Volunteer Park is one of the highlights of Seattle's Olmsted park and boulevard system. The Board of Park Commissioners brought John Charles Olmsted, of the Olmsted Brothers' Landscape Architects firm, to Seattle in 1903 to design a park system which would provide open space and help guide development in the rapidly growing city. In Olmsted's first comprehensive plan, Volunteer Park served as the central park of the system due to its location near downtown.

Hired that same year to develop plans for Volunteer Park, Olmsted and his associates studied the landscape and built the plans around its natural beauty. Taking advantage of its ridgetop location, Olmsted ran one axis of the park's plan along the top of the hill, laying out a concourse running north and south through the park. It is lined with an allé of chestnut trees stretching between the two ends of the drive. A second axis runs through the city's municipal water system reservoir, which had been built in 1901. At the intersection of the two axes, he placed a concert grove, pergola, and terraced planting beds flanked by lily ponds.

On the eastern side of the park, paths looped around the concert grove and connected the interior of the park with the streetcar stop at 15th Avenue East and East Prospect Street. Large lawns surrounded by planting beds and groves of trees filled the interior. Multi-layered plantings filled planting beds on the perimeter of the park on the east, south, and west, to buffer the park from the city beyond its borders. On the western side of the park, the landscape featured lawns and more wooded areas. A carriage drive looped down the slope and around the reservoir connecting with the concourse drive at its northern and southern ends.

The original 1904 plan had a small children's playground at the northwest corner of the park. It included a shelterhouse with restrooms and a covered area that provided seating for caregivers as their charges enjoyed the sandboxes, swings, “Little Folks Lawn,” and wading pool. A revised 1909 plan added a playground for larger children at the request of playground advocates. Neighbors objected to its location on account of the noise potential, and this playground was moved to the northeast corner of the park.

The northern edge of the park is largely reserved for the work areas of the park. The caretaker's cottage, the greenhouses, and other facilities are located along the northern fenceline. The conservatory was added in 1912, built from a kit purchased from the Hitchings Company of New York.

The pergola Olmsted sited on the concourse featured a “concert grove” on its east side. It is shown on Olmsted plans as a cluster of trees adjacent to a covered shelter in the middle of the pergola. In 1915, the Park Department built a bandshell, designed by prominent Seattle architect Carl Gould, on the edge of the lawn north of the reservoir. Olmsted objected to its siting there because of its intrusion on the greensward – the great lawn, but it better served the type of musical performances that were popular at that time. It was a wooden structure and had to be torn down in 1947 because of rotted timbers. A new stage structure, designed by Rich Haag, was built in 1971. In 2021 construction started on a new amphitheater to replace this stage structure, which opened in July 2022. The new construction provides additional utility such as storage, a dressing room, and a roof over the stage.

An effort by the Washington State Art Association to build a museum in the park was rebuffed in 1910. Olmsted argued that, “Volunteer Park is obviously a landscape park – not an ornamental public square nor primarily a public playground. The conclusion is evident that the proposed art museum is not suggested as a means for the public to enjoy the landscape of the park… Owing to its size and style of architecture, the art museum is in no way to be subordinate to the park landscape, but on the contrary the museum would completely dominate a large part if not the whole of the park… destroying much of the landscape value of this park.” The issue would arise again, however, when the Fuller family offered to donate funding for construction of a museum for the Seattle Art Institute. The Park Department accepted the offer and the Seattle Art Museum was built in 1932. It would serve as home to the Seattle Art Museum until 1991, when a new building was constructed downtown. The Volunteer Park building became the new home of SAM’s Asian art collections and was renamed Seattle Asian Art Museum.

In 1991, the Seattle Post-Intelligencer reported that Volunteer Park was "notorious" as a major cruising spot for men who have sex with men. That year, the city cleared out dense landscaping in the park and renovated a children's play area in an attempt to prevent cruising. The Seattle Police Department had previously clashed with gay men in the park. In 1963, The Seattle Times reported on the arrests of 11 men "in connection with homosexual behavior" by plain-clothes officers in Volunteer Park and other areas. In 1972, four gay residents of Seattle spoke out about police harassment and entrapment targeted at the queer community, including in Volunteer Park.

== Features ==
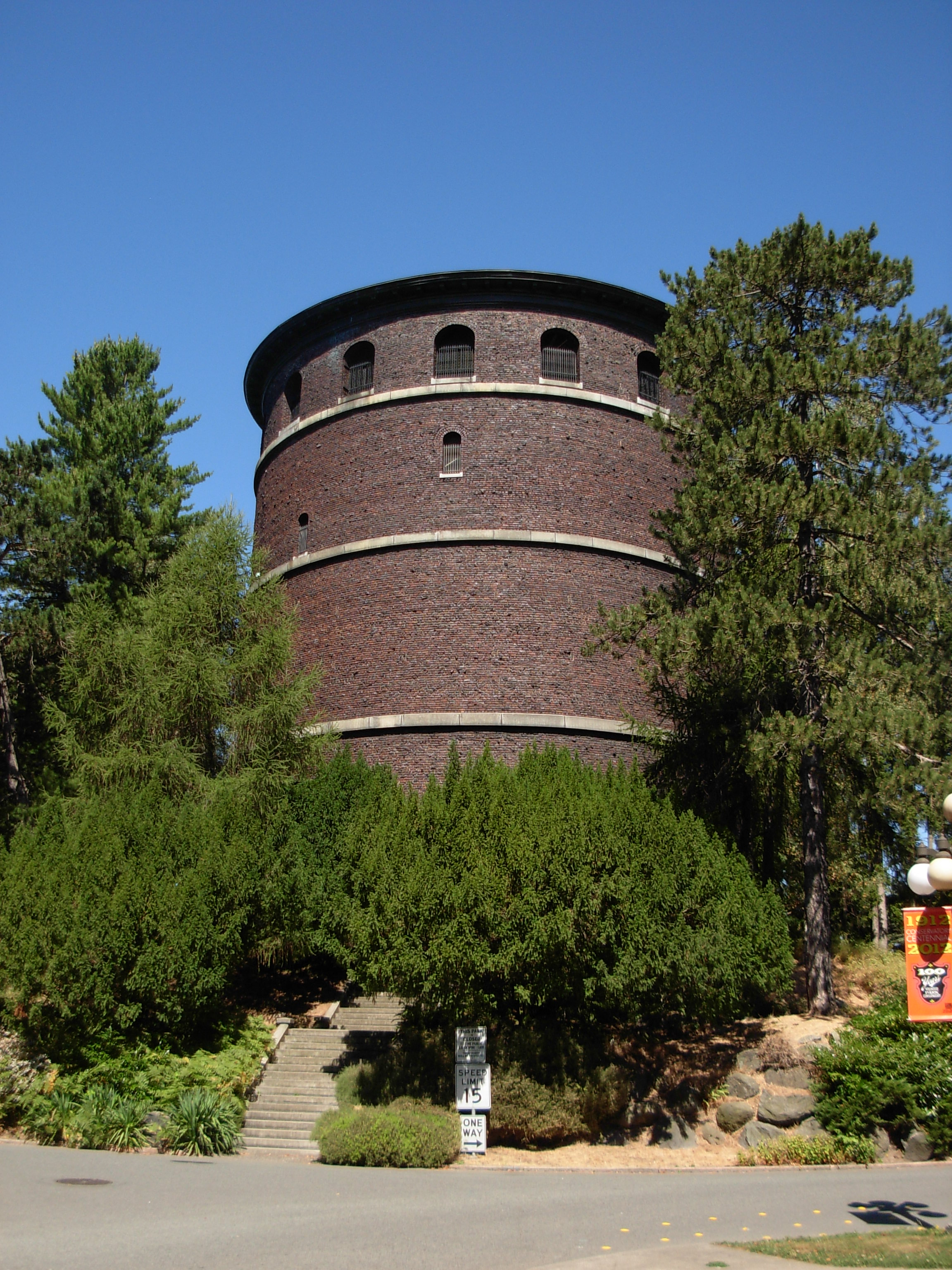
Volunteer Park Water Tower

The park includes a conservatory (a designated city landmark) which was completed in 1912; an amphitheater; a water tower with an observation deck, built by the Water Department in 1906, a fenced-off reservoir; the dramatic Art Deco building of the Seattle Asian Art Museum (a designated city landmark); a statue of William H. Seward; a memorial to Judge Thomas Burke; and a sculpture, Black Sun, by Isamu Noguchi (colloquially referred to as "The Doughnut"), around which a scenic view of the Seattle skyline that prominently features the Space Needle can be seen, as well as several meadows and picnic tables. The wading pool is operational in the summer months and operates daily from 11 a.m. to 8 p.m.

Volunteer Park is also well known for its extensive dahlia garden in season. There are also koi ponds at the park which are home to the fish during the summer months.

== Events ==
The park hosts various free concerts and outdoor theater events throughout the year. There are also picnic tables for birthday parties and ample space for outdoor sports like touch football, frisbee and various field day activities.

Volunteer Park has hosted Pride Month programming in various forms for decades. In 1974, when activist David Neth organized Seattle's first Gay Pride Week, the festivities included singing and roller-skating on the Volunteer Park Water Tower. Between the 1980s and 2005, Seattle's Pride Parade followed Broadway to end in Volunteer Park at a festival. Later, Trans Pride Seattle and Pride in the Park became annual events within Volunteer Park during Pride Month.

== See also ==
- List of Olmsted parks in Seattle
