= Florida, Orange County, New York =

Florida
- Village
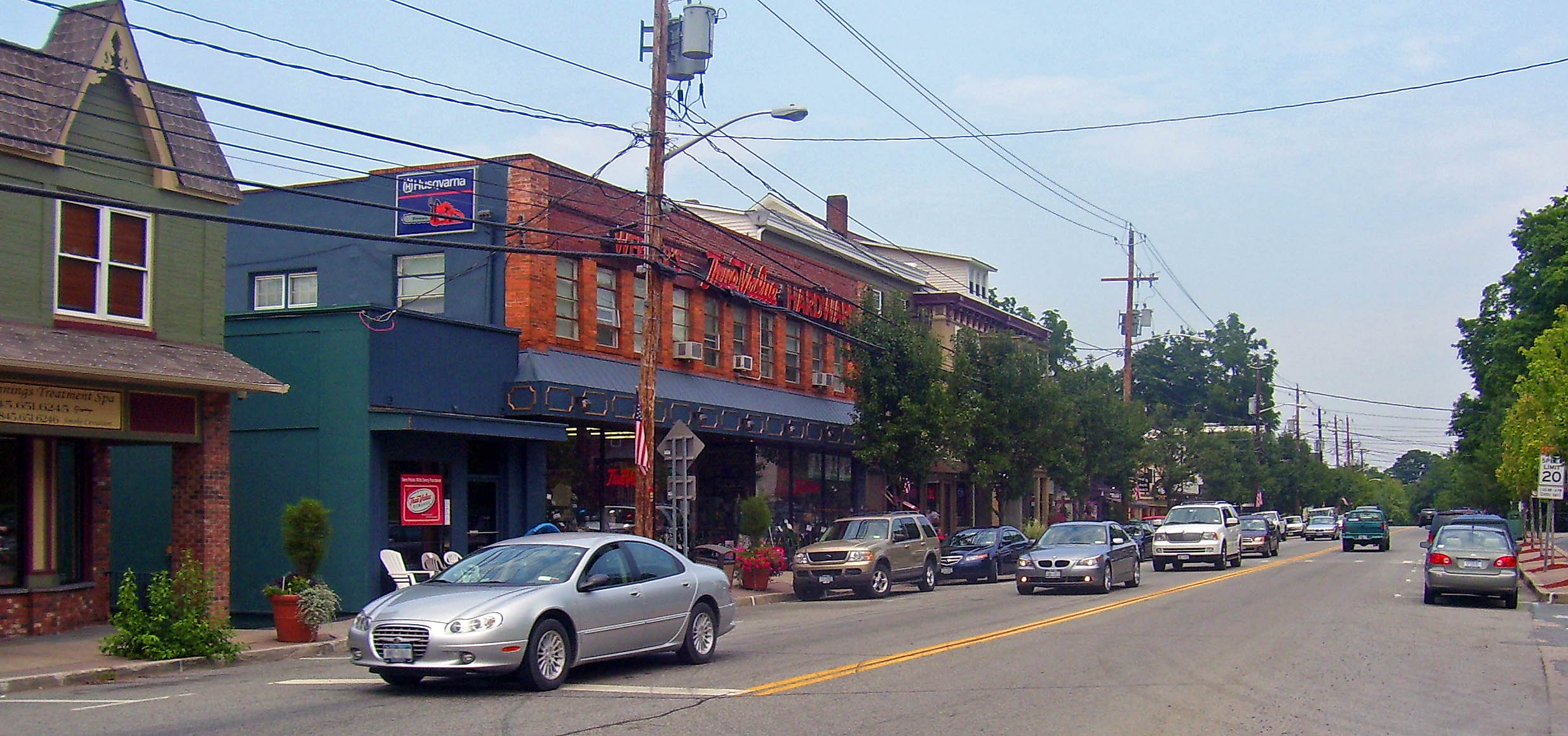
- Downtown Florida, 2007

- Location in Orange County and the state of New York.

- Location within the state of New York
- Coordinates: 41°20′N 74°22′W
- Country: United States
- State: New York
- County: Orange
- Towns: Warwick, Goshen

Area
  - Total: 2.25 sq mi (5.84 km^{2})
  - Land: 2.25 sq mi (5.83 km^{2})
  - Water: 0.0039 sq mi (0.01 km^{2}) 0%
- Elevation: 446 ft (136 m)

Population (2020)
  - Total: 2,888
  - Density: 1,282.7/sq mi (495.26/km^{2})
- Time zone: UTC-5 (EST)
  - Summer (DST): UTC-4 (EDT)
- ZIP code: 10921
- Area code: 845
- FIPS code: 36-26319
- GNIS feature ID: 0950303
- Website: https://villageoffloridany.gov/

Florida is a village in Orange County, New York, United States. The population was 2,888 as of the 2020 census. It is part of the Poughkeepsie-Newburgh Metropolitan Statistical Area as well as the larger New York–Newark–Bridgeport, NY-NJ-CT-PA Combined Statistical Area. The village is located in the town of Warwick, with two small northern portions in the town of Goshen. Florida is at the convergence of Routes 17A and 94.

Florida has its own school district known as the Florida Union Free School District. The district consists of Golden Hill Elementary School and S. S. Seward Institute. The mascot for S.S. Seward Institute is a Spartan.

The current mayor is Daniel Harter Jr., who was elected in March 2018.

== History ==
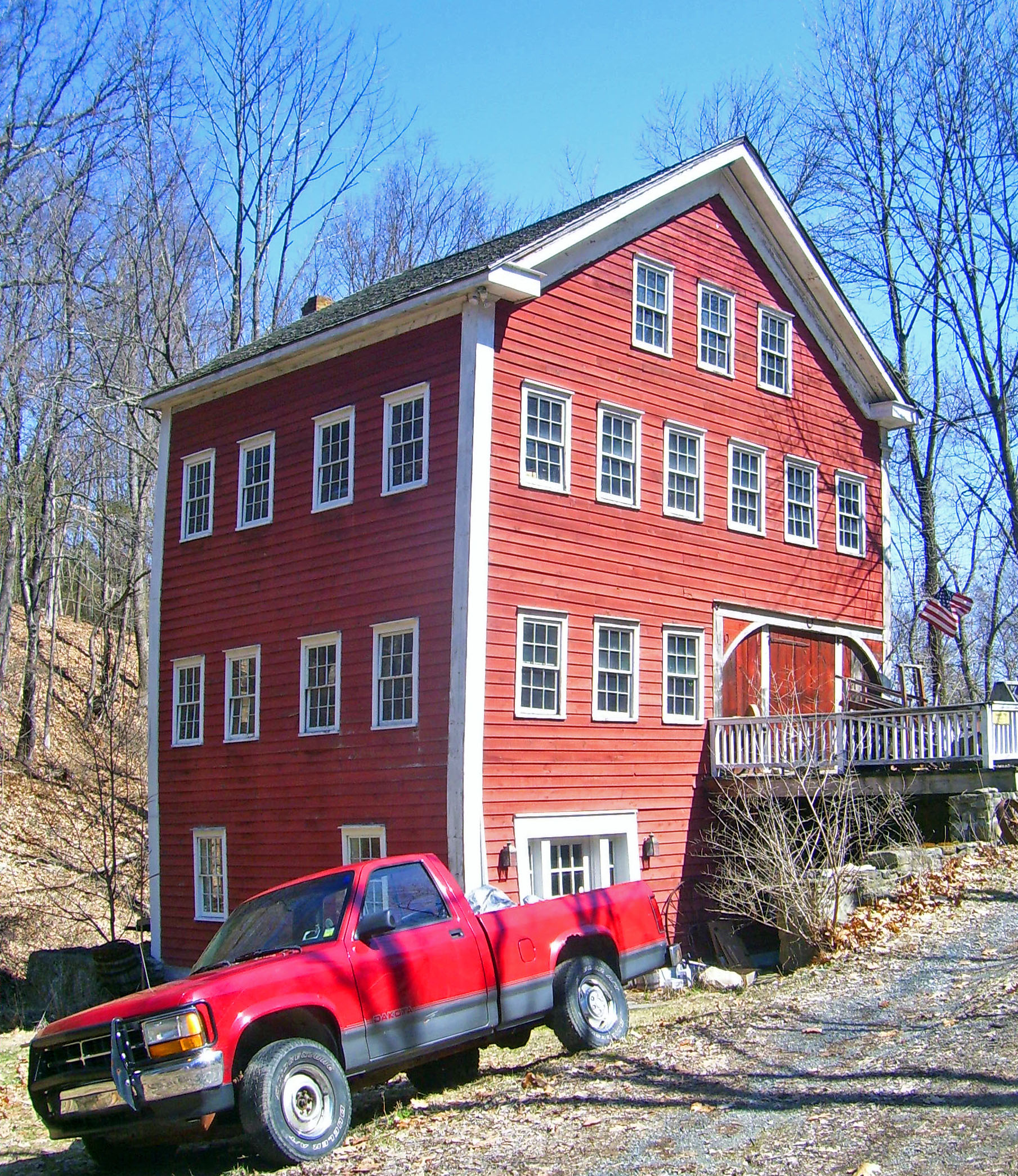
Culver Randel House and Mill along NY 94 on the north side of Florida

The area had been occupied by indigenous peoples for thousands of years.

The part of the Wawayanda Patent which contained the present day village was known as the Florida Tract. The initial settlement on the site was known as Brookland but was given its current name in the 1760s. It was incorporated in 1946.

Florida is in a farming area known for the vast onion fields in the nearby Black Dirt Region.

Local radio station, WTBQ was located in Florida from 1984 to 2007, on Main Street, in the white professional bldg, across from S.S. Seward. The station is currently located two miles south of the Village of Warwick.

== Geography ==
The village is west of Glenmere Lake and north of Warwick.

Florida is located at 41°19′52″N 74°21′33″W (41.331217, -74.359167).

According to the United States Census Bureau, the village has a total area of 1.9 square miles (4.9 km^{2}), all land.

== Demographics ==
Historical population
| Census | Pop. | Note | %± |
|---|---|---|---|
| 1870 | 459 | | — |
| 1950 | 1,376 | | — |
| 1960 | 1,550 | | 12.6% |
| 1970 | 1,674 | | 8.0% |
| 1980 | 1,947 | | 16.3% |
| 1990 | 2,497 | | 28.2% |
| 2000 | 2,571 | | 3.0% |
| 2010 | 2,833 | | 10.2% |
| 2020 | 2,888 | | 1.9% |
U.S. Decennial Census

As of the census of 2000, there were 2,571 people, 951 households, and 704 families residing in the village. The population density was 1,361.8 inhabitants per square mile (525.8/km^{2}). There were 974 housing units at an average density of 515.9 per square mile (199.2/km^{2}). The racial makeup of the village was 93.04% white, 2.53% African American, 0.51% Native American, 0.62% Asian, 1.87% from other races, and 1.44% from two or more races. Hispanic or Latino of any race were 6.50% of the population.

There were 951 households, out of which 36.1% had children under the age of 18 living with them, 59.0% were married couples living together, 11.4% had a female householder with no husband present, and 25.9% were non-families. 21.8% of all households were made up of individuals, and 10.3% had someone living alone who was 65 years of age or older. The average household size was 2.70 and the average family size was 3.17.

In the village, the population was spread out, with 26.7% under the age of 18, 6.2% from 18 to 24, 30.2% from 25 to 44, 24.2% from 45 to 64, and 12.8% who were 65 years of age or older. The median age was 38 years. For every 100 females, there were 90.3 males. For every 100 females age 18 and over, there were 90.0 males.

The median income for a household in the village was $54,893, and the median income for a family was $61,406. Males had a median income of $45,577 versus $32,232 for females. The per capita income for the village was $22,138. About 5.5% of families and 7.3% of the population were below the poverty line, including 6.7% of those under age 18 and 3.5% of those age 65 or over.

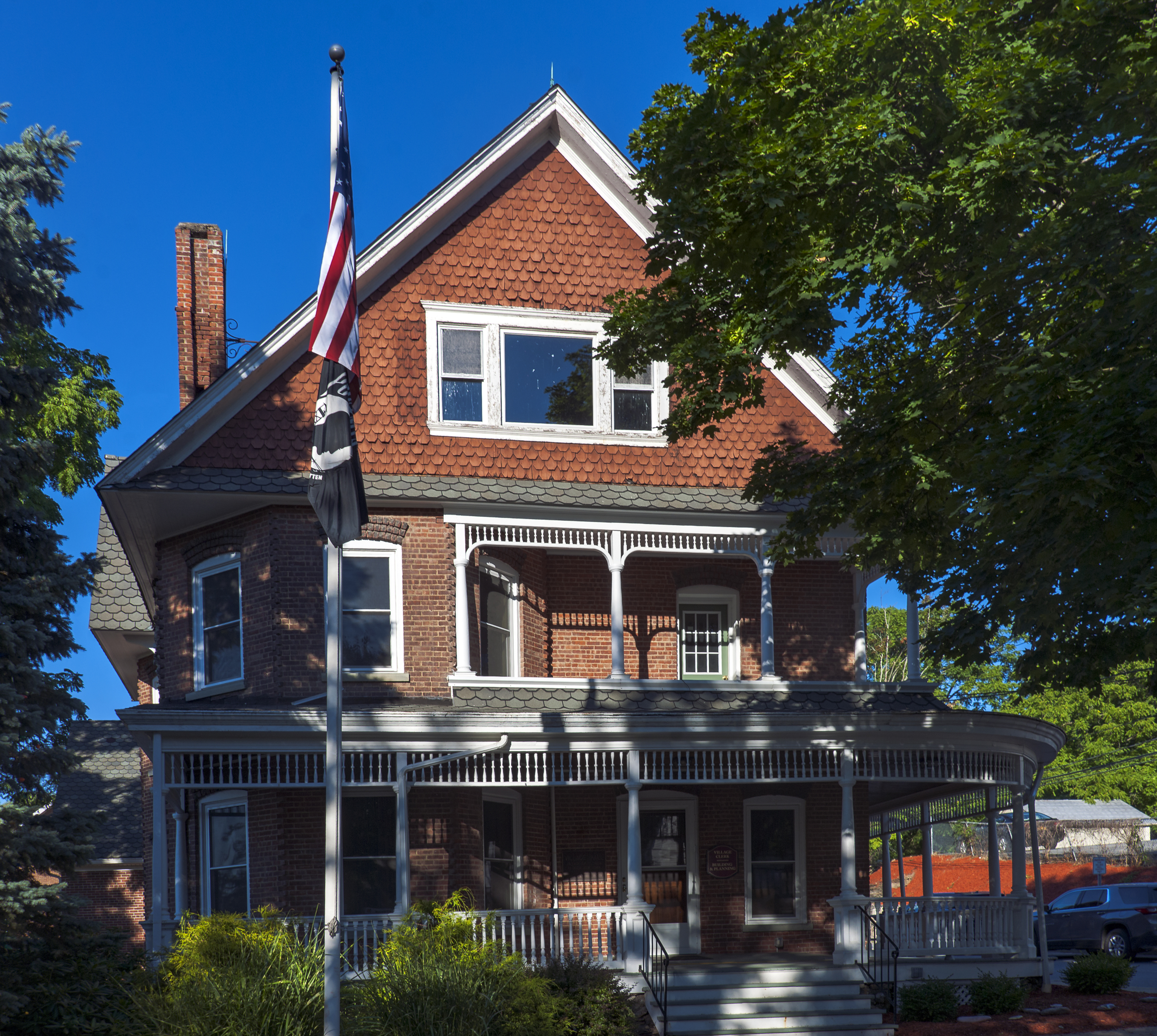
Village hall

During the 19th century, the community was settled by a wave of Polish immigrants. They followed earlier settlers who were mostly migrants from New England, arriving after the Native American population had declined.

== Notable people ==
- William H. Seward (May 16, 1801 – October 10, 1872), born in Florida, was the 12th Governor of New York, United States Senator, and the United States Secretary of State under Abraham Lincoln and Andrew Johnson
- Jimmy Sturr, 18x Grammy Award "Polka King" lifelong resident.

== In popular culture ==
- The village of Florida was featured in the hit TV show Law & Order: Special Victims Unit in the 2007 episode entitled "Florida."
- The Jerky Boys, on their 1996 comedy album Jerky Boys 3, a Florida, New York resident named Mike, responds to a prank used chainsaw ad, becoming the butt of the joke.
