= John Tears Inn =

- U.S. National Register of Historic Places
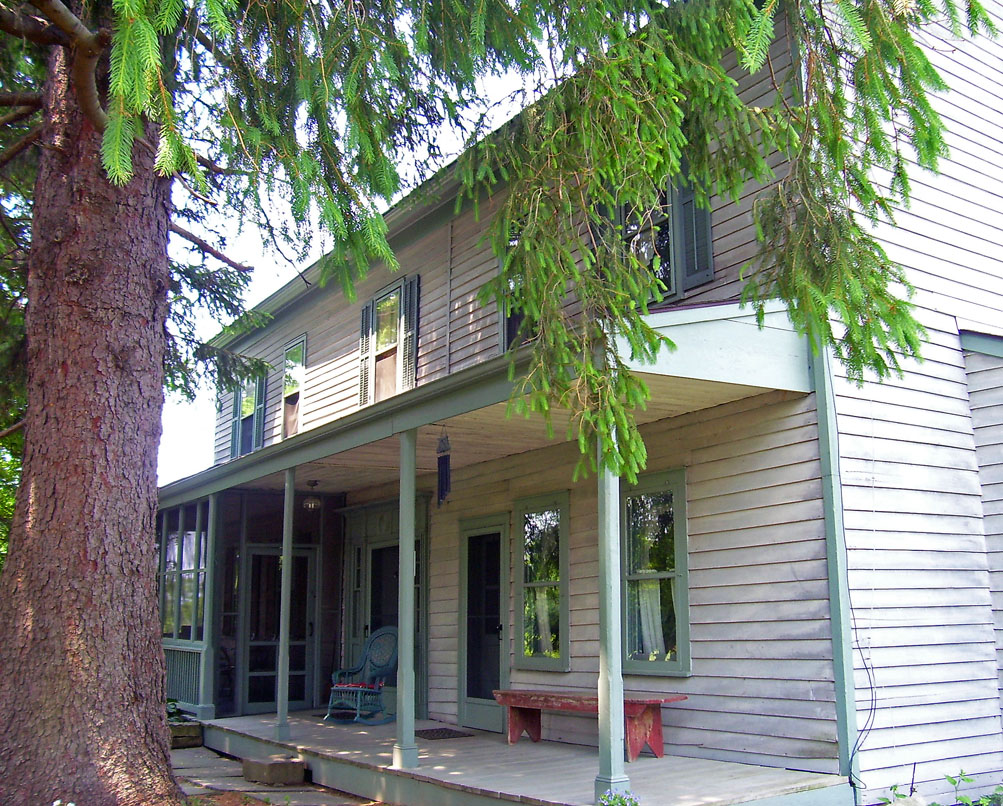
- The inn in 2007, now a private home
- Location: Town of Wallkill, NY
- Nearest city: Middletown
- Coordinates: 41°29′28″N 74°21′56″W
- Area: 20 acres (8.1 ha)
- Built: 1770s
- Architectural style: Early Republic, Federal
- NRHP reference No.: 97000940
- Added to NRHP: 1997

The John Tears Inn is located along Goshen Turnpike between the hamlets of Circleville and Scotchtown in the Orange County, New York, town of Wallkill. It was built approximately 1790 and provided a stopover for travelers on the Goshen Turnpike due to its location midway between Bloomingburg and Goshen.

== History ==
Tears, the son of an early German settler of the region, bought the inn property in 1793 from a New York merchant named John Taylor. The deed mentions a house and outbuilding already on the land.

He continued to add to the property, eventually building it up to its present size of 20 acres (81,000 m^{2}). In 1824 his father died, and Tears got a tavern license and likely built the Federal style addition on the house at that time. A finely crafted Adam style entrance, wood molding and faux marble fireplaces indicate that the inn was doing rather well. Many of the structures later built for the farm are still standing on the property

Upon Tears' death in 1840, he left the inn to his sons Charles and Andrew with the stipulation that his wife be granted tenancy for life and she receive an ample firewood supply. Charles sold his interest in the property to a John McWilliams in 1844, and the latter family took the business over completely when Andrew died six years later. McWilliams' widow in turn sold the building to Clarkson Bird in 1894, beginning a succession of owners that ended in 1936 with the Trimmer family leasing the land. They would buy it outright in 1950. Today Leona Trimmer lives in the house and runs an antique store in the barn.

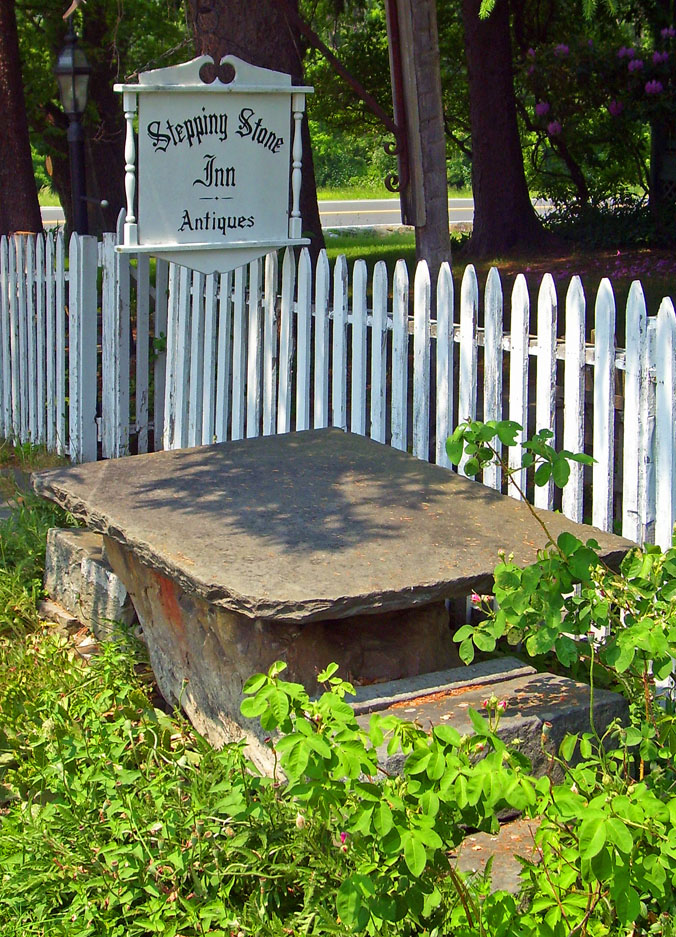
The original stepping stone, which allowed travelers to easily disembark from carriages, survives today and lends its name to the business on the premises.

It was added to the National Register of Historic Places in 1997 and is currently the only property in the town so listed. In 2006 the property was threatened when a developer proposed to use an abandoned town road through part of the land in order to reach a proposed housing development, but so far that has not come to pass.
