= Congregation B'nai B'rith (Santa Barbara, California) =

Reform synagogue in Santa Barbara

Coordinates: 34.4547°N 119.7845°W

Religion
- Affiliation: Reform Judaism
- Ecclesiastical or organisational status: Synagogue
- Status: Active

Location
- Location: Santa Barbara, California
- Country: United States
- Interactive map of Congregation B'nai B'rith

Architecture
- Established: 1927

Website
- https://cbbsb.org/

Congregation B'nai B'rith (Hebrew: בני ברית, "Children of the Covenant") is a Reform Jewish synagogue located in Santa Barbara, California. Founded in 1927, it is the largest synagogue in the Santa Barbara area. The congregation serves more than 800 member households. The synagogue is led by Senior Rabbi Daniel Brenner, Rabbi Maddy Anderson, and Cantor Mark Childs.

== History ==
Congregation B'nai B'rith was formally organized in 1927 as a nonprofit religious organization. It later established its campus on San Antonio Creek Road, where it remains today. In 2004, Rabbi Stephen Cohen became the congregation's rabbi after previously serving as director of UC Santa Barbara Hillel. After over 20 years of service, Cohen retired as rabbi in 2025.

In 2017, the congregation celebrated its 90th anniversary.

== Leadership transition ==
In December 2025, Rabbi Daniel Brenner was formally installed as senior rabbi of the congregation. Brenner had first joined the synagogue as a rabbinic intern and later served as assistant rabbi before succeeding Rabbi Stephen Cohen upon Cohen's retirement. His installation was marked by a weekend of services and community events, including a Shabbat service featuring Hebrew Union College president Andrew Rehfeld and musical guests Nava Tehila.

== Music and clergy ==
Cantor Mark Childs has served as cantor of the congregation since 1992. In 2017, the synagogue marked his 25th year of service. Childs studied sacred music at Hebrew Union College and has been active in interfaith initiatives in Santa Barbara County.

== 2009 Jesusita Fire ==
In May 2009, Congregation B'nai B'rith was placed under mandatory evacuation during the Jesusita Fire, which burned more than 3,500 acres in Santa Barbara County. Torah scrolls were removed from the synagogue for protection, and services were temporarily relocated to UC Santa Barbara Hillel.
