= Panken =

Panken is a surname. Notable people with the surname include:

- Aaron D. Panken (1964–2018), American Reform rabbi and academic administrator
- Harold I. Panken (1910–1999), New York state senator
- Jacob Panken (1879–1968), American judge and politician
- Ted Panken, American writer and journalist
