= Cordell Schachter =

American technology manager

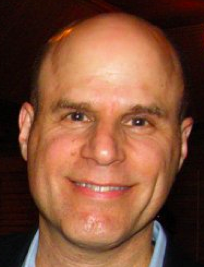
- Schachter in 2012
- Born: August 30, 1960 (age 66); Dobbs Ferry, New York, U.S.
- Occupation: Technology manager
- Spouse: Jackie Kuhls
- Children: 2

Cordell Schachter (born August 30, 1960) is an American technology manager who has held positions in both public service and commercial firms. He was the Chief Information Officer of the United States Department of Transportation from 2021 to January 2025 and was the Chief Technology Officer (CTO) of the New York City Department of Transportation from 2008 to 2021.

Schachter began his career at the New York City Department of Parks & Recreation in the 1980s, rising to the position of Assistant Chief of Technical Services for that agency. He then worked in several private sector posts managing network and media technology. In 2006, he rejoined the city government as Associate Commissioner and Chief Project Officer for the New York City Department of Information Technology and Telecommunications and was promoted to CTO at the city's Department of Transportation in 2008. He moved to the U.S. Department of Transportation in August 2021 and left in January 2025.

== Early life and career ==
Schachter was born in Dobbs Ferry, New York, the oldest of three children of Maurice and Arlene Schachter; the family moved to Middletown, New York, in 1967. Schachter's father was a principal of Lafayette Avenue Securities, a bond brokerage firm, and his mother was a school library clerk. Schachter graduated from Middletown High School in 1978. He received a BA degree in Economics from the State University of New York at Buffalo (1983), where he served in student government, becoming president of the Student Association in 1982–83, and an MS in Management from the New York University Wagner School of Public Service (1995). He is certified as a Project Management Professional by the Project Management Institute.

Schachter began his career at the New York City Department of Parks & Recreation in the late 1980s, rising to the position of assistant chief of technical services for that agency, where he oversaw technical support services to all New York City parks. In the late 1990s and early 2000s, he worked in several private sector posts, managing network and media technology projects for leading technology firms including IBM, AT&T, Avaya and Siemens, involving web platforms, national voice-over IP conversions, and international wide area networks, including network support for two Olympics. In 2006, he rejoined the city government as associate commissioner and chief project officer for the New York City Department of Information Technology and Telecommunications, where he managed the implementation of a project and portfolio management system and the city's Emergency Communications Transformation Program, among other projects.

He has been an adjunct lecturer at St. Peter's University in New Jersey and was an adjunct professor in New York University's Center for Urban Science and Progress and Wagner School of Public Service.

== New York City Department of Transportation ==
In June 2008, Schachter became the Chief Technology Officer of the New York City Department of Transportation (DOT). One project of the DOT, overseen by Schachter in 2012, was the development of a web-based mobile application that allows inspectors at street construction sites to use lightweight touch-screen tablets and the city's private wireless cellular network to retrieve assignments, issue violation notices on the spot, and transmit reports in real time. Using the application, inspections are processed in one day instead of three, improving safety as well as saving the city money. The application won a "Best of New York" mobile app award. In 2013, Schacter's team was praised by InformationWeek for developing a GIS web-based map application that allowed the DOT to rapidly and accurately assess and document damage to city infrastructure caused by Hurricane Sandy, so that rebuilding could begin, and that also helped the department apply for Federal relief funds. The application won a 2013 Digital Government Achievement Award in the "Government-to-government category".

Shachter pursued a strategy of "mobile first development", as most users began accessing DOT information on mobile devices. Writing about the DOT in Internet Evolution, Kim Davis commented: "I was impressed by [Schachter's] refreshingly simple approach to mobile devices, the creative approach to apps (I was amazed that so much of the DoT's app development takes place in-house), and struck by the constraints on IT procurement." During his tenure, among other things, the DOT introduced the Citi Bike program; a map-based app called iRideNYC that lets travellers know when the next bus or subway train will arrive and where the nearest stops are; the Walk NYC wayfinding project; and Vision Zero View, "an interactive tool that details traffic injuries and fatalities, and highlights the city’s response to make the streets safer". His department won one a Best Practices Award granted by Amazon Web Services (AWS) to local government agencies around the world, in its 2014 City on a Cloud challenge, recognizing "innovative and impactful local government projects running on the AWS Cloud".

In 2014, Schachter's department rolled out a permit management system that, among other capabilities, "streamlines virtually every aspect of obtaining a [construction or repair] permit. ... The new system gives utility workers and construction contractors the ability to apply for permits 24/7/365 [from anywhere] using any device – desktop, tablet or smartphone – and ... to print out permit signs to post on their work sites", while reviewers at the DOT can more quickly process the permits and make sure that there are no conflicting applications or permits issued. The team won the Igniting Innovation 2015 Award from The American Council for Technology and Industry Advisory Council (ACT-IAC) for this system. In 2015, Schachter was featured in Government Technology magazine's article "Best Practices for 24/7 Government".

In 2018, he was named as one of Government Technology magazine's "Top 25 Doers, Dreamers & Drivers" of 2018. The feature noted that, among other projects, Schachter led the development of a new GIS-based sign management system for the city that lets staff obtain work orders throughout the city. During the COVID-19 pandemic, Schachter helped his department transition to telework and helped the city to create a streamlined application process for outdoor dining setups in front of restaurants.

== U.S. Department of Transportation and later ==
Schachter joined the United States Department of Transportation (USDOT) as Chief Information Officer (CIO) on August 30, 2021. There he oversaw a $3.5 billion IT budget and inherited 31 major projects left by his predecessor. In December 2021, Schachter testified before the United States House Committee on Transportation and Infrastructure about cybersecurity affecting US transportation and infrastructure. He stated that his office was running "a series of cyber sprints" to prioritize "system access control, website security, and improved governance, oversight and coordination", and "meet the challenge of continuously improving the cybersecurity of USDOT information technology systems while keeping those systems available for use." In 2023, Schacter emphasized that USDOT grants under the Infrastructure Investment and Jobs Act would include a focus on designing cybersecurity into new infrastructure, from the beginning of new projects and programs, as part of its goal to improve resilience from all hazards affecting transportation in the US. He left the role in January 2025.

Schachter has served as a transportation and technology consultant with Riverdale Adviosrs.

== Personal ==
In the early 2000s, Schachter was President of Bronx Community School Board 10, where he helped foster the creation of two schools: the IN-Tech Academy and the Riverdale Kingsbridge Academy. An avid skier, in the 2010s Schachter volunteered as the treasurer of the Coalition to Save Belleayre. He serves on the Board of Trustees of Riverdale Temple. Schachter is married to Jackie Kuhls, former Chief Budget Officer, Department of Subways, MTA New York City Transit, and previously executive director of New Yorkers Against Gun Violence. The couple have two adult children.
