= Jay Sexter =

American educator

Jay Sexter (February 13, 1936 – May 21, 2024) was an American educator who was the president of Mercy College (1990–1999) and the Provost, CEO and vice president for academic affairs for Touro College of Osteopathic Medicine (2000–2015). A library at the Henderson, Nevada location of Touro was named in his honor as well as a lecture hall at another of its locations in Middletown, New York.

== Early life and education ==
Sexter grew up in Sea Gate, Brooklyn, New York. He completed his undergraduate education at the City College of New York. Sexter then attended Hunter College where he received his master's degree in social studies education. He then completed a second master's degree at the University of Southern California in counseling psychology. Upon graduating from the University of Southern California, Sexter completed his doctorate in educational psychology at Fordham University.

== Career ==
While at Fordham University, Sexter became the youngest school district superintendent in New York State. He was a teacher, guidance counselor, and principal. Sexter continued in the educational field and worked as an assistant professor at Fordham University in 1972. He remained at Fordham University until 1985. Throughout his 13 years at Fordham University, Sexter received several promotions. He was promoted to a department chairperson, dean, assistant vice-president, and an associate vice-president for academic affairs.

In 1985, Sexter transplanted to the John Jay College of Criminal Justice. Over the course of five years, Sexter served as the chief academic officer, provost, and academic vice-president. He engaged in a variety of research related to criminal justice, and doubled the grant funding for research in this field, while working at John Jay. He became more prominent in the realm of higher education, and traveled to several countries, such as Japan, Korea, and China, to lecture on law enforcement personnel.

In 1990, Sexter became president of Mercy College. Within a nine-year term, Sexter increased the student population at Mercy College from 4,800 to over 12,000. Additionally, he worked to develop several medical programs and dramatically increased the college's endowment. He retired in 1999 and became the first President Emeritus of Mercy College.

After his retirement, Sexter received a phone call from Dr. Bernard Lander, the founder and president of Touro College requesting his help in the development of a medical school in California. Sexter agreed to help in this endeavor and moved to Vallejo, California, in 2000. While living on campus for a year, Sexter expanded the Osteopathic Medical School and created six additional programs in California. Some of the new programs that Sexter created included Physical Therapy, Pharmacy, and Physical Assistant Programs. In 2001, Sexter went to Nevada and chose property for Touro College to build its new campus. Sexter was essential to this campus' development. He designed the campus, supervised its construction, and obtained approval for the School of Osteopathic Medicine, Nursing, Education, Physical Therapy, and Occupational Therapy. He then left to return to New York, where he initiated another Touro campus. Sexter has worked as the CEO of the medical school campus in Central Harlem, and then opened another campus in Middletown, New York. He retired at the end of the 2015 academic year, and continues to serve as a consultant for the osteopathic schools in New York, Vallejo, and Henderson Nevada.

He served as a member of the board of directors, and is the executive vice president of American Collegiate Acquisitions, Inc.

== Personal life ==
Sexter lived in Boynton Beach, Florida with his wife, Eva Spinelli Sexter. Together, Sexter and his wife had five children and five grand children.
