= Middletown Airport =

Middletown Airport may refer to:

- Harrisburg International Airport, near Middletown, Dauphin County, Pennsylvania
- Middletown Regional Airport, serving Middletown, Ohio
- Randall Airport, serving Middletown, Orange County, New York
