= Middletown School District =

Middletown School District can refer to the following public school districts in the United States:

- Enlarged City School District of Middletown in Middletown, New York
- Middletown Area School District in Middletown, Pennsylvania
- Middletown City School District in Middletown, Ohio
- Middletown Township Public School District in Middletown Township, New Jersey
- Middletown Unified School District in Lake County, California
- Middletown Public Schools (Rhode Island)

== See also ==
- Middleton School District, Idaho
- Appoquinimink School District, which serves Middletown, Delaware
