= Mike Avilés =

American baseball player (born 1981)

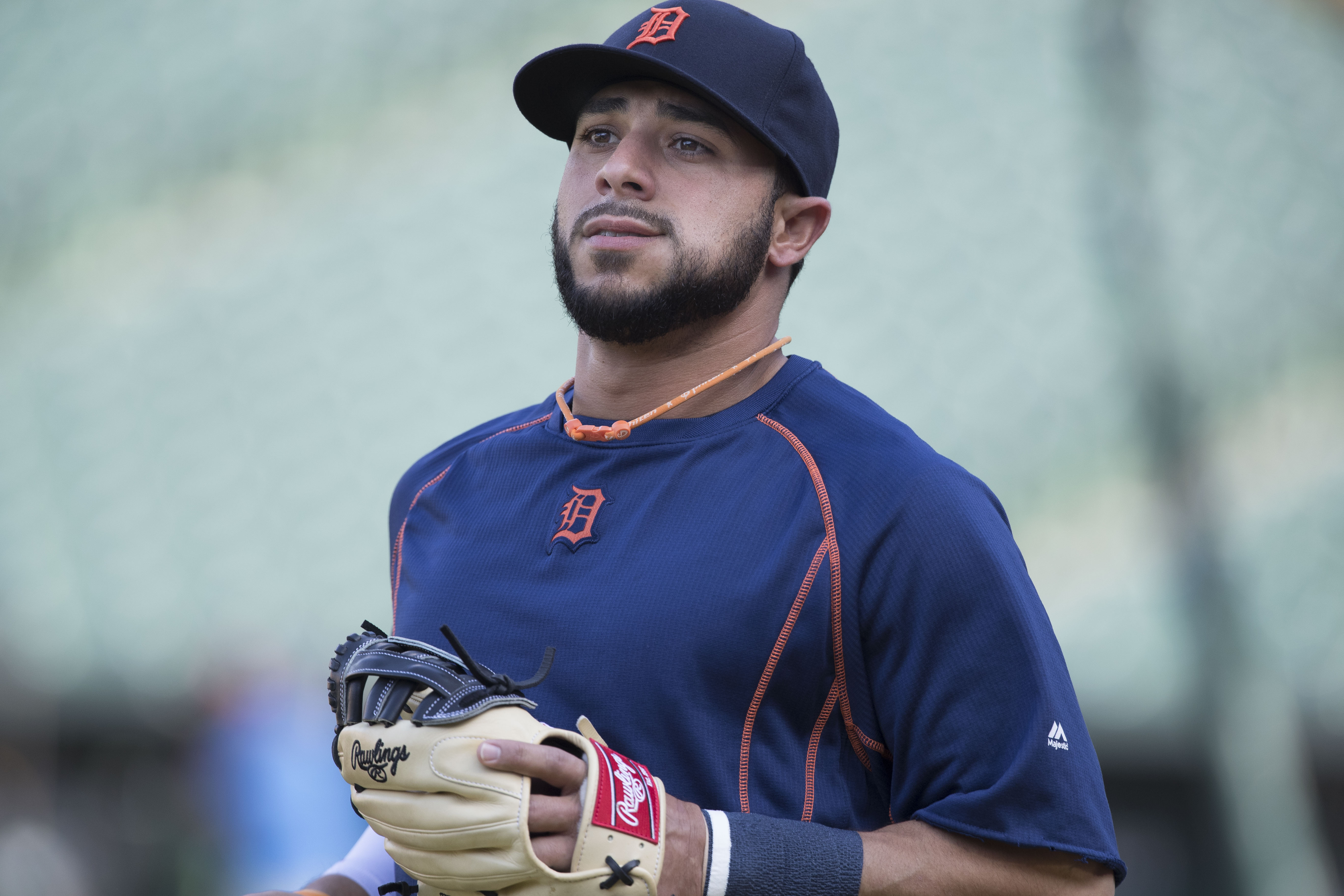
- Avilés with the Detroit Tigers in 2016
- Infielder
- Born: March 13, 1981 (age 45); New York, New York, U.S.
- Batted: Right Threw: Right

MLB debut
- May 29, 2008, for the Kansas City Royals

Last MLB appearance
- October 1, 2017, for the Miami Marlins

MLB statistics
- Batting average: .261
- Home runs: 60
- Runs batted in: 306
- Stats at Baseball Reference

Teams
- Kansas City Royals (2008–2011); Boston Red Sox (2011–2012); Cleveland Indians (2013–2015); Detroit Tigers (2016); Miami Marlins (2017)
Medals
Men's baseball
Representing Puerto Rico
World Baseball Classic
Silver medal – second place	2013 San Francisco	Team
Silver medal – second place	2017 Los Angeles	Team

Michael Anthony Avilés [ah-vee-les'] (born March 13, 1981) is an American former professional baseball utility player. He played in Major League Baseball (MLB) for the Kansas City Royals, Boston Red Sox, Cleveland Indians, Detroit Tigers and Miami Marlins. Over the course of his career, Aviles has played every position except for pitcher and catcher.

== Amateur career ==
Avilés was born in New York City to a Puerto Rican family, and raised in the Castle Hill section of the Bronx. Aviles later moved with his family to Middletown, New York shortly before starting high school, graduating from Middletown High School in 1999. Aviles was a Division II All-American shortstop at Concordia College, in Bronxville, New York, and was named Division II Player of the Year in 2003, after hitting .500 with 83 runs, 22 home runs and 65 runs batted in (RBI) in 45 games. In 2002, he played collegiate summer baseball with the Brewster Whitecaps of the Cape Cod Baseball League.

== Professional career ==
=== Minor leagues ===
Aviles was chosen in the seventh round of the 2003 Major League Baseball draft by the Kansas City Royals and offered an "insulting" $1,000 signing bonus. He spent 2004 with the Wilmington Blue Rocks in the Carolina League and 2005 with the Wichita Wranglers in the Texas League. He then spent 2006 and 2007 with the Omaha Royals of the Pacific Coast League, becoming the Royals' Minor League Player of The Year in 2007. He started 2008 in the minors, batting .338 with 10 home runs and 42 RBI in 50 games with Omaha.

== Major leagues ==
=== Kansas City Royals ===
Avilés was called up from Triple-A on May 29, 2008, to replace designated hitter Billy Butler on the roster. He finished his rookie season with a .325 batting average in 102 games, with 10 home runs and 51 RBI. If Avilés had recorded a sufficient number of plate appearances to qualify for the American League (AL) batting title, his .325 average would have ranked third among all AL hitters and sixth-best in the major leagues. On November 11, 2008, the Royals named Avilés their 2008 Player of the Year. Avilés finished fourth in the AL Rookie of the Year standings, ending in fourth place behind Evan Longoria, Alexei Ramírez and Jacoby Ellsbury.

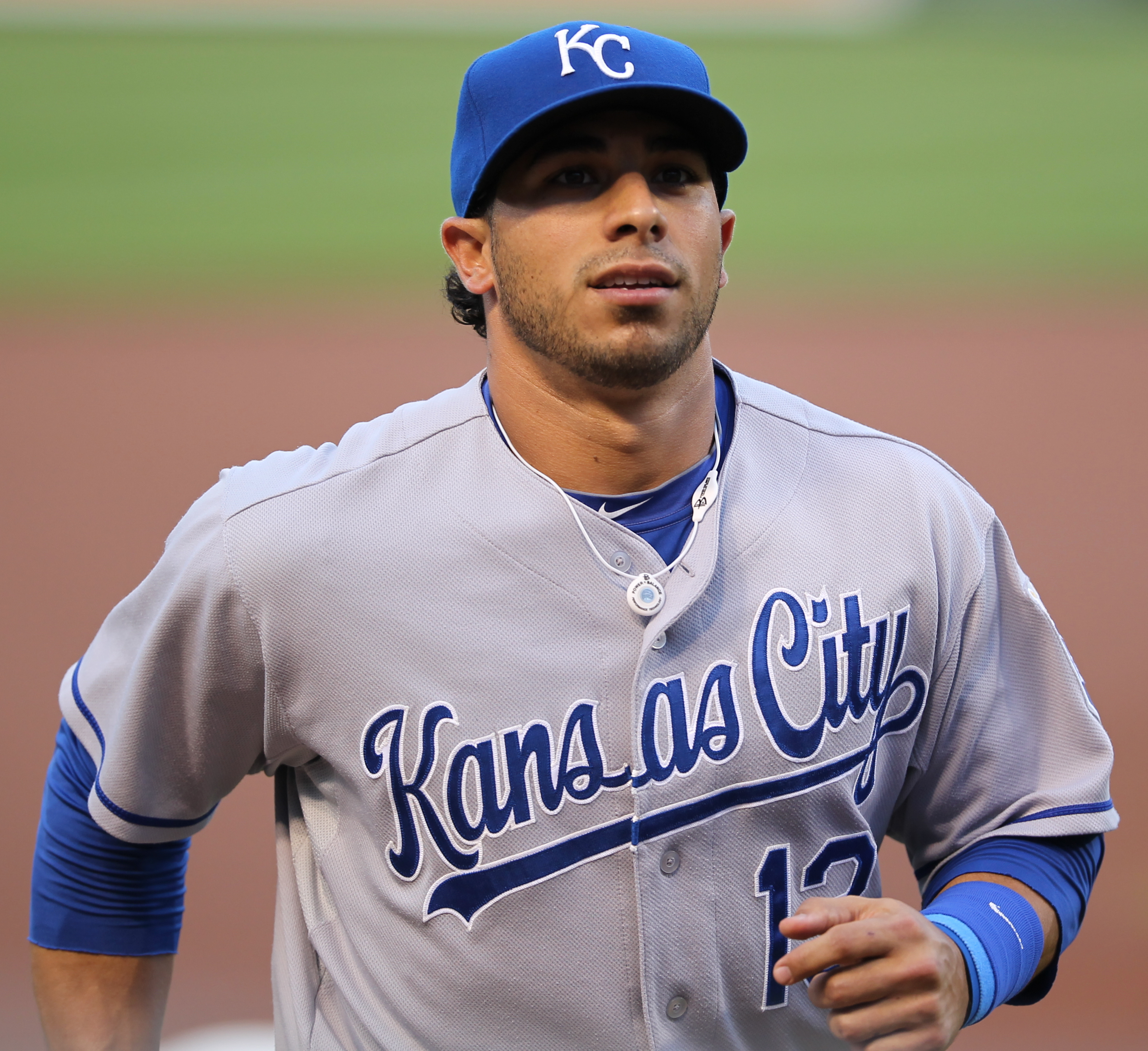
Avilés during his tenure with the Kansas City Royals in 2011

Avilés strained his arm playing with Puerto Rico during the 2009 World Baseball Classic, which necessitated Tommy John surgery in June that ended his 2009 season.

Avilés began the 2011 season as the Royals' starting third baseman but was optioned to Omaha when the Royals decided to call up top prospect Mike Moustakas.

=== Boston Red Sox ===
On July 30, 2011, the Royals traded Aviles to the Red Sox for shortstop Yamaico Navarro and pitching prospect Kendal Volz. Aviles hit his first home run as a member of the Red Sox on September 16. He hit the ball so hard that it put a hole through the Sports Authority sign on the Green Monster. Avilés became the starting shortstop for the Red Sox in 2012 after Marco Scutaro and Jed Lowrie were traded. On May 19 and 20, 2012, he hit leadoff home runs in back-to-back games. On October 21, 2012, the Red Sox traded Aviles and cash considerations to the Toronto Blue Jays for pitcher David Carpenter and the release of manager John Farrell from the final year of his contract.

=== Cleveland Indians ===
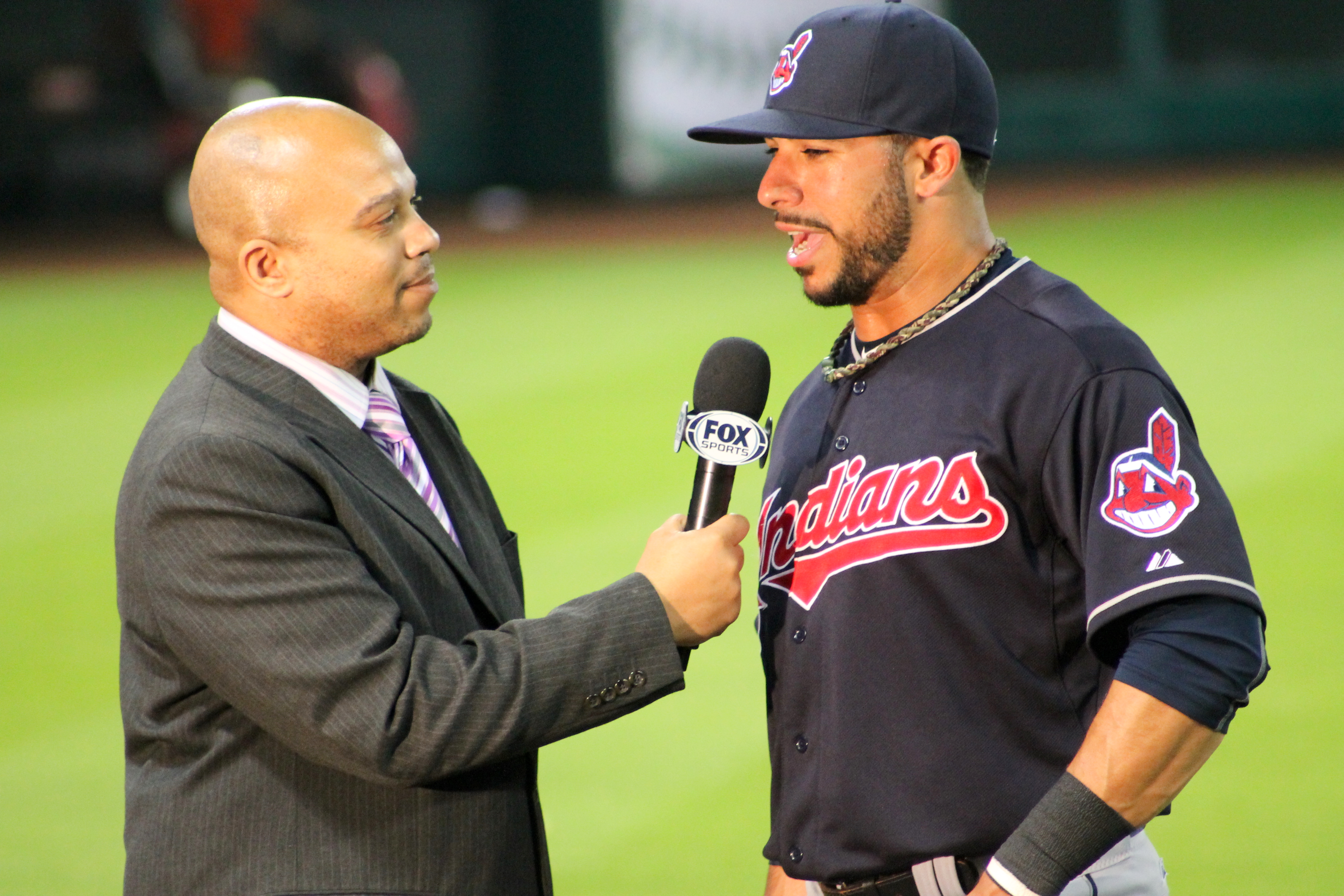
Avilés with Andre Knott at Minute Maid Park in 2015

On November 3, 2012, the Blue Jays announced that they had traded Aviles and Yan Gomes to the Cleveland Indians for Esmil Rogers. On February 7, 2013, Aviles avoided arbitration with the Indians, agreeing to a two-year, $6 million deal with a club option for 2015.

In 2013 and 2014, Aviles was versatile on defense. He played six positions in 2014, spending no more than 28 games at any position. He did not make a single error during the entire 2014 season. After the 2014 season, an SB Nation article described him as a below-average hitter. Aviles had 1623 plate appearances between 2011 and 2014. Of the 170 players with at least that many plate appearances, Aviles had the lowest on-base percentage (.281). During the 2015 season he hit .231 with five home runs and 17 RBI in 98 games.

=== Detroit Tigers ===
On December 18, 2015, the Detroit Tigers signed Avilés to a one-year contract. He batted .210 in 68 games for the Tigers.

On August 16, 2016, the Tigers traded Avilés and Kade Scivicque to the Atlanta Braves in exchange for Erick Aybar. He was designated for assignment the next day. On August 21, 2016, the Braves released Aviles.

=== Miami Marlins ===
The Miami Marlins signed Avilés to a minor league contract on May 10, 2017. They promoted Avilés to the major leagues on May 12. He was designated for assignment on May 17.

== Personal life ==
Avilés is married to Jessy Poulsen and the couple have twin girls and a son. He also has a daughter with his ex-wife. In 2015, one of his twin daughters was diagnosed with leukemia.

His uncle, Ramón Avilés, was also a utility player with the Boston Red Sox (1977) and Philadelphia Phillies (1979–1981).
