= Aaron D. Panken =

American Reform rabbi

9th President of Hebrew Union College - Jewish Institute of Religion
- In office January 1, 2014 – May 5, 2018
- Preceded by: David Ellenson
- Succeeded by: David Ellenson (interim); Andrew Rehfeld

Personal details
- Born: May 19, 1964 New York City, New York, U.S.
- Died: May 5, 2018 (aged 53) Middletown, New York, U.S.
- Cause of death: Plane crash
- Spouse: Lisa Messinger (m. 1992)
- Education: Johns Hopkins University; New York University

Aaron D. Panken (May 19, 1964 – May 5, 2018) was an American Reform rabbi and academic administrator. He served as the 9th president of the Hebrew Union College-Jewish Institute of Religion.

== Early life ==
Panken was born on May 19, 1964, in New York City, New York. He graduated from Johns Hopkins University, where he earned a bachelor's degree in electrical engineering. He also earned a doctorate in Hebrew and Judaic Studies from New York University. He married Lisa Messinger in 1992.

== Career ==
Panken was ordained by the HUC-JIR in New York in 1991 and joined the faculty there in 1995. He was installed as the president on June 8, 2014 and led the organization that has 4,000 active alumni who served the estimated 1.5 million adherents of Reform Judaism in some 900 congregations.

Panken was a rabbi, scholar, teacher and Reform Jewish leader for almost three decades. He spoke as an invited scholar through the years at congregational and university communities throughout the United States and Israel, at Jewish camps in North America and South Africa and at locations such as the University of Sydney and the University of Nanjing. He was a certified commercial pilot and sailor.

== Death ==
Panken was killed in a plane crash on Saturday, May 5, 2018, at Randall Airport, in Middletown, New York, during a routine flight check with an instructor. Upon hearing of his death, many tributes appeared from around the world including from Israel's consul general in New York, Dani Dayan, Rabbi Jonah Pesner and many others. Dan Shapiro, the former U.S. Ambassador to Israel, said that Panken was a "brilliant Jewish leader."
