= Garnet Health =

Upstate New York Health System, post merge

Coordinates: 41.44212°N 74.36833°W

Geography
- Location: Middletown, New York, United States

Organization
- Affiliated university: Touro College of Osteopathic Medicine

Links
- Lists: Hospitals in New York State

Garnet Health is a Middletown, New York-based three-campus health system which, together with its three urgent-care facilities, provides care to approximately 500,000 residents in Orange and Sullivan Counties, and surrounding areas in New York State. The hospital's roots date back to 1887.

== Background ==
=== Garnet Health ===
Garnet Health is the current umbrella corporation and is the current brand for all three medical centers in Middletown (Garnet Health Medical Center), Harris (Garnet Health Medical Center - Catskills, Harris Campus), and Callicoon (Garnet Health Medical Center - Catskills, Callicoon Campus) plus three urgent-care facilities, and physician practices under the brand name "Garnet Health Doctors". It was previously named Greater Hudson Valley Health System, that included two medical centers, Orange Regional Medical Center and Catskills Regional.

=== Garnet Health Medical Center ===
Orange Regional Medical Center was the previous name for the consolidation of Horton Medical Center and Arden Hill Hospital that occurred in 2002.

Initially both hospital locations continued to operate under their new name. In 2009 Orange Regional began construction of a new facility, with the goal of having a single, more modern facility. It was ready in 2011, and the two earlier locations closed.

Construction had been done using a then-innovative cost-saving method named design-build; it also saved money and allowed adding more beds, with a total of 353 parient rooms. The hospital was formed as "a consolidation of Arden Hill Hospital in Goshen and Horton Medical Center in Middletown,". After rebranding, this location is now named Garnet Health Medical Center.

Garnet Health Medical Center is a Federally-designated Primary stroke center.

=== Horton Medical Center ===
Horton Medical Center began with fundraising in 1887, with a facility named Thrall Hospital opening in 1892. A newer building, using the name Elizabeth A. Horton Memorial Hospital opened in 1929. New wings and additional structures were added in 1956, 1971, and 1980.

=== Arden Hill Hospital ===
Arden Hill Hospital originated with a 1908 fundraising effort under the name Goshen Hospital. After enhancements and relocations, it became Arden in 1967. It closed in 2011, when the new Orange Regional facility became operational.

=== Garnet Health Medical Center - Catskills ===
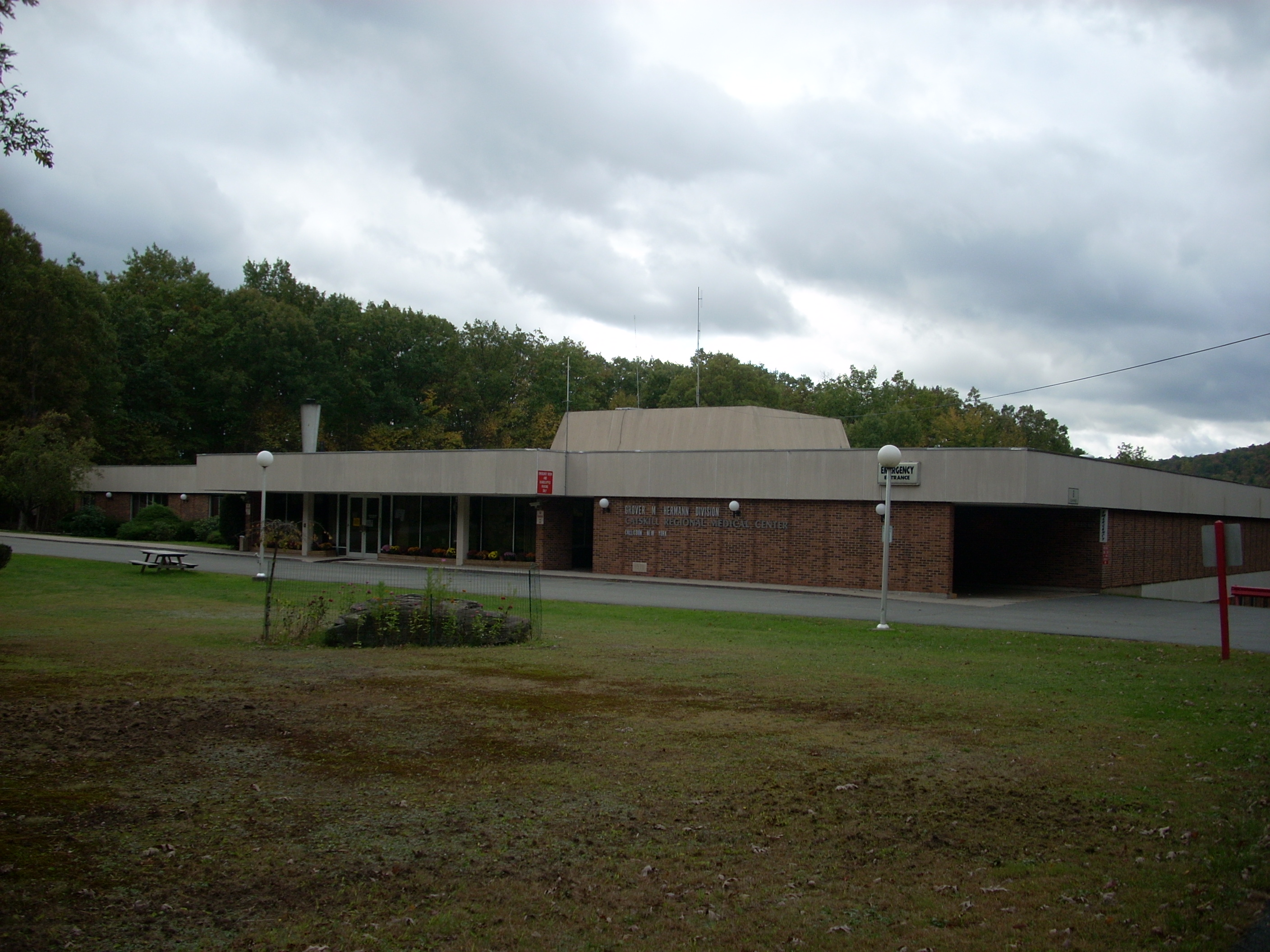
Grover M Hermann Division of Catskill Regional Medical Center

Catskills Regional Medical Center was the previous name of the organization that includes a hospital in Harris, New York and the smaller 25-bed facility in Callicoon. These were part of the previously named Greater Hudson Valley Health System, now named Garnet Health Medical Center - Catskills. With the 2011 closing of Horton and Arden, the main Garnet Health site and these two Catskills facilities comprise the medical center's three campuses.

Garnet Health Medical Center - Catskills, Harris Campus is a Federally-designated Primary stroke center.
