= Michigan Corners, New York =

Hamlet in New York, United States

Coordinates: 41°28′01″N 074°20′52″W

Michigan Corners is a hamlet near Scotchtown east of Middletown, Orange County, New York, United States, located at the corner of New York State Route 211 and Goshen Turnpike (Orange County Route 110).

There is no sign marking Michigan Corners, although it does appear on local maps. (There was a Michigan Corners Deli nearby, but the business was renamed Scotchtown Deli and Catering in 2007.) According to legend, the hamlet got its name when a local man named Malcolm McLaughlin found himself in debt and skipped town circa 1825. He was away for some time, and when he returned he told everyone he had gone to Michigan. McLaughlin later opened a tavern at this place, and his neighbors referred to his establishment as "Michigan". Soon, the name of the tavern was applied to that section of the town.
