= Touro College of Osteopathic Medicine =

Osteopathic medical school of Touro University

- Type: Private medical school
- Established: 2007
- Affiliations: Judaism
- Budget: $28.40 million
- Dean: Kenneth J. Steier, DO, FACOI, FCCP, MBA, MHA, MPH
- Academic staff: 675 Full- and Part-time
- Students: 810
- Location: New York (Harlem) & Middletown, New York, United States; 40.80917°N 73.94981°W
- Campus: Multiple types
- Website: tourocom.touro.edu

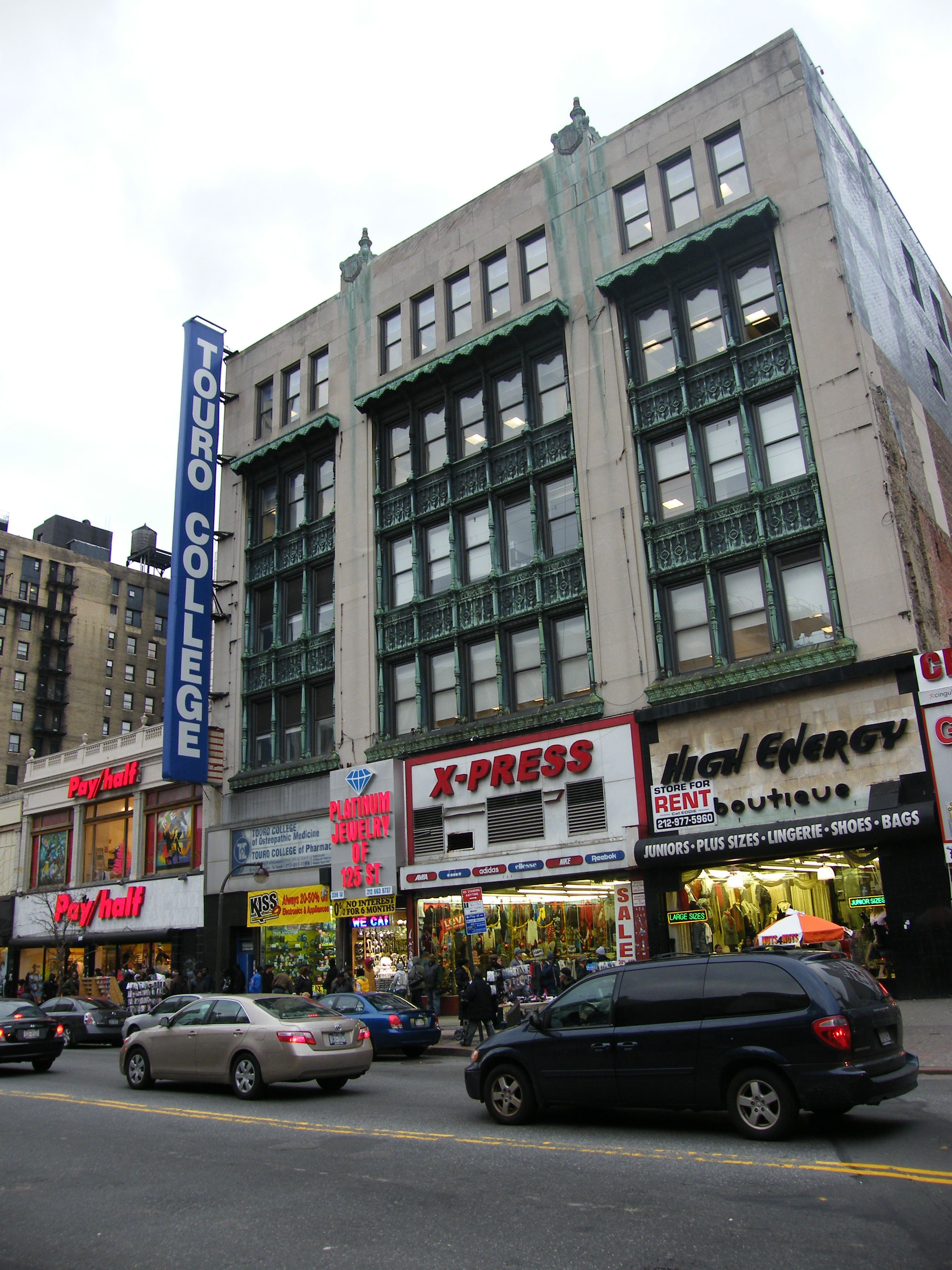

The Touro College of Osteopathic Medicine (TouroCOM) is a private medical school with its main campus in the neighborhood of Central Harlem in New York City and additional campuses in Middletown, New York, and Great Falls, Montana. It is a division of the Touro University System.

When it opened in 2007, it was the first medical school to open in New York State in nearly 30 years and was the first osteopathic medical school with a special emphasis on training minority doctors. TouroCOM has a student body of about 1,080 students.

TouroCOM has a stated goal of particularly identifying and recruiting students willing to make a commitment to practice in underserved communities. The Harlem neighborhood has been designated by the federal government as underserved by medical professionals. Community service events such as free health counseling, screenings, and flu shots are offered to local residents by students and faculty several times a year.

== History ==
Touro College of Osteopathic Medicine opened in 2007, in Harlem, New York. It was the first medical school to open in New York State in nearly 30 years and is the first osteopathic medical school with a special emphasis on training minority doctors. The college's inaugural class graduated in 2011. The Middletown campus graduated their first class in 2018. TouroCOM is a division of Touro University.

In 2009, students from Touro College of Osteopathic Medicine worked with DKMS Americas (along with assistance from the Harlem community and the Apollo Theater) to arrange a Bone Marrow Registration Drive that resulted in about 200 new bone marrow registrants. The drive was inspired by the need to find a bone marrow donor match for Jasmina Anema, a six-year-old African American girl fighting leukemia, who died in 2010.

TouroCOM launched MedAchieve Scholars in 2012, a program that encourages students from underrepresented groups to pursue careers in science, technology, engineering, and mathematics. In 2015, the NAACP recognized the Harlem campus's efforts to increase the number of underrepresented minorities in medicine through MedAchieve, the Mentoring in Medicine program that brings local high school students into TouroCOM's anatomy labs, and the Fund for Underrepresented minority students.

In 2023, the college opened a campus in Great Falls, Montana.

== Academics ==
TouroCOM has a student body of about 1,080 students and offers two degrees, a Doctor of Osteopathic Medicine (DO) and a Master of Science. Over 200 underrepresented minority students have matriculated since the school's inception in 2007.

=== Accreditation ===
Touro College of Osteopathic Medicine is accredited by the Middle States Commission on Higher Education and received the status of initial award of accreditation from the American Osteopathic Association's Commission on Osteopathic College Accreditation (COCA).

=== Admissions ===
Applicants apply through the American Association of Colleges of Osteopathic Medicine Application Service (AACOMAS). For the Class of 2020, TouroCOM received 6,574 applications for 292 first-year positions between the Harlem and Middletown campuses. No early decision program is offered.

=== Graduation and residency ===
In May 2024, 124 Doctors graduated from TouroCOM, with a 99% match rate for the class. Upon completion of their medical education, students apply to residency or internship programs throughout the country through the National Residency Match Program (NRMP), AOA Match, Military Match, or other matching programs.

Approximately 60 percent of Touro College of Osteopathic Medicine students work in primary care following graduation.

== Campuses ==
=== Harlem, Manhattan, New York ===
The Touro College of Osteopathic Medicine Harlem Campus is located at 230 West 125th Street, between Adam Clayton Powell Jr. Boulevard and Frederick Douglass Boulevard. It is diagonally across from the historic Apollo Theater in Manhattan's Harlem neighborhood. The campus is located two blocks east of the A, B, and D train and one block west of the 2 and 3 train.

=== Middletown, New York ===
In August 2014, a larger campus that occupies 110,000 square feet of space at the former site of the Horton Medical Center opened in Middletown, New York. The inaugural class consisted of 135 students, and graduated in 2018.

=== Great Falls, Montana ===
In 2021, Touro College & University System and Benefis Health System broke ground on a new Touro College of Osteopathic Medicine campus in Great Falls, Montana. The campus opened in August of 2023. The school is located next to Benefis, where students do clinical rotations. The school has up to 125 students each year.

== Notable faculty ==
- David Paterson, Professor of health care and public policy, former Governor of New York
- Jay Sexter, former Vice president of academic affairs
- Jeff Gardere, Associate Professor and Course Director of Behavioral Medicine, media personality known as 'Dr Jeff'

== See also ==
- Touro University
- Osteopathic medicine in the United States
