= Mechanicstown, New York =

- CDP
- Location in Orange County and the state of New York.

- Location within the state of New York
- Coordinates: 41°26′58″N 74°23′39″W
- Country: United States
- State: New York
- County: Orange

Area
  - Total: 3.41 sq mi (8.82 km^{2})
  - Land: 3.35 sq mi (8.67 km^{2})
  - Water: 0.054 sq mi (0.14 km^{2})
- Elevation: 531 ft (162 m)

Population (2020)
  - Total: 8,065
  - Density: 2,408.2/sq mi (929.81/km^{2})
- Time zone: UTC-5 (Eastern (EST))
  - Summer (DST): UTC-4 (EDT)
- FIPS code: 36-46349
- GNIS feature ID: 0956896

Mechanicstown is a hamlet (and census-designated place) in Orange County, New York, United States. The population was 8,065 at the 2020 census. It is part of the Kiryas Joel–Poughkeepsie–Newburgh, NY Metropolitan Statistical Area as well as the larger New York–Newark–Bridgeport, NY-NJ-CT-PA Combined Statistical Area.

Mechanicstown is in the Town of Walkill, southeast of the City of Middletown.

== Geography ==
Mechanicstown is located at 41°26′58″N 74°23′39″W (41.449568, -74.394114).

According to the United States Census Bureau, the CDP has a total area of 3.4 square miles (8.8 km^{2}), of which 3.3 square miles (8.5 km^{2}) is land and 0.1 square miles (0.26 km^{2}) (2.06%) is water.

== Demographics ==
Historical population
Census	Pop.	Note	%±
2000	6,061		—
2010	6,858		13.1%
2020	8,065		17.6%
U.S. Decennial Census

=== 2020 census ===
As of the 2020 census, Mechanicstown had a population of 8,065. The median age was 43.2 years. 18.9% of residents were under the age of 18 and 20.8% of residents were 65 years of age or older. For every 100 females there were 86.7 males, and for every 100 females age 18 and over there were 83.4 males age 18 and over.

100.0% of residents lived in urban areas, while 0.0% lived in rural areas.

There were 3,445 households in Mechanicstown, of which 26.1% had children under the age of 18 living in them. Of all households, 36.8% were married-couple households, 19.5% were households with a male householder and no spouse or partner present, and 35.9% were households with a female householder and no spouse or partner present. About 34.1% of all households were made up of individuals and 16.1% had someone living alone who was 65 years of age or older.

There were 3,628 housing units, of which 5.0% were vacant. The homeowner vacancy rate was 1.7% and the rental vacancy rate was 4.4%.

Racial composition as of the 2020 census
Race	Number	Percent
White	3,067	38.0%
Black or African American	2,052	25.4%
American Indian and Alaska Native	68	0.8%
Asian	380	4.7%
Native Hawaiian and Other Pacific Islander	13	0.2%
Some other race	1,488	18.5%
Two or more races	997	12.4%
Hispanic or Latino (of any race)	2,710	33.6%

=== 2010 census ===
As of the 2010 census, there were 6,858 people. The racial makeup was 47.1% white, 28.6% Hispanic, 20.9% African-American, 3.1% Asian, and 0.3% Native American.

=== 2000 census ===
As of the census of 2000, there were 6,061 people, 2,241 households, and 1,479 families residing in the CDP. The population density was 1,821.9 inhabitants per square mile (703.4/km^{2}). There were 2,311 housing units at an average density of 694.7 per square mile (268.2/km^{2}). The racial makeup of the CDP was 72.41% White, 13.91% African American, 0.45% Native American, 2.85% Asian, 0.10% Pacific Islander, 6.90% from other races, and 3.38% from two or more races. Hispanic or Latino of any race were 19.88% of the population.

There were 2,241 households, out of which 33.8% had children under the age of 18 living with them, 46.0% were married couples living together, 14.2% had a female householder with no husband present, and 34.0% were non-families. 28.0% of all households were made up of individuals, and 12.2% had someone living alone who was 65 years of age or older. The average household size was 2.58 and the average family size was 3.18.

In the CDP, the population was spread out, with 24.8% under the age of 18, 9.1% from 18 to 24, 29.1% from 25 to 44, 21.5% from 45 to 64, and 15.5% who were 65 years of age or older. The median age was 37 years. For every 100 females, there were 86.6 males. For every 100 females age 18 and over, there were 81.8 males.

The median income for a household in the CDP was $45,817, and the median income for a family was $51,699. Males had a median income of $35,918 versus $28,640 for females. The per capita income for the CDP was $21,119. About 14.1% of families and 14.8% of the population were below the poverty line, including 22.7% of those under age 18 and 13.9% of those age 65 or over.

== Education ==
It is in the Middletown City School District.
