= First Congregational Church of Middletown =

Historic church in New York, United States

- U.S. National Register of Historic Places
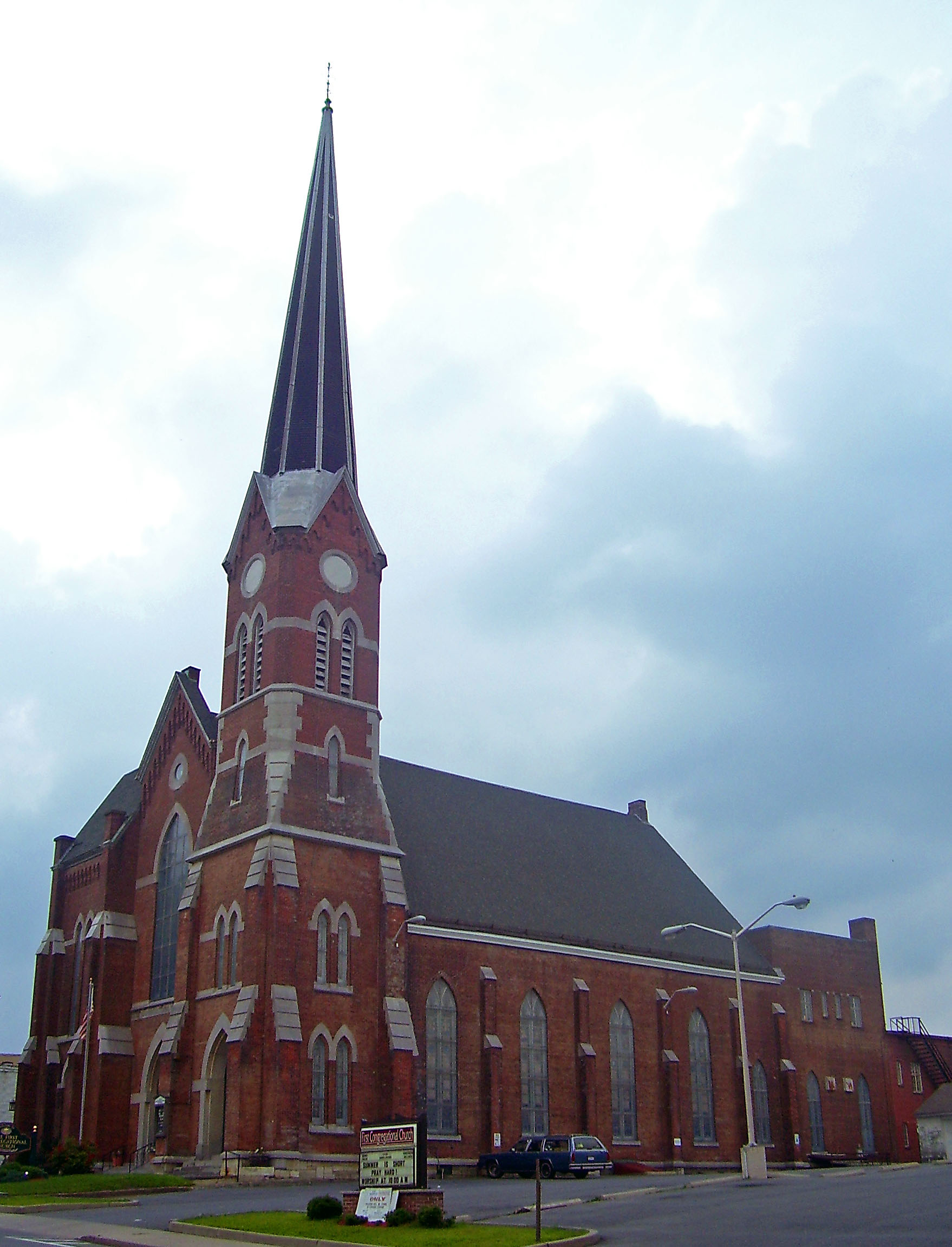
- Church in 2007

- Location within New York
- Location: 35 E. Main St., Middletown, NY
- Coordinates: 41°26′44″N 74°25′09″W
- Area: 1 acre (0.40 ha)
- Built: 1772
- Architect: Perry, Isaac; Terhune, P.H.
- Architectural style: Gothic Revival
- NRHP reference No.: 05001382
- Added to NRHP: December 7, 2005

The First Congregational Church of Middletown, New York, United States is one of the most visible landmarks of that city's downtown skyline. Its spire rises higher than any other church or structure in the central neighborhoods of the city. Constructed in 1872, this is the third church built by this congregation.

The congregation was established in 1785, after the American Revolutionary War, by migrants who came from New England. The first church was built before residents had even named their settlement of houses and farms. It has been argued that the formation of the church at that time marks the beginning of Middletown's existence as a village. For 40 years it was the only church in the area. The current Gothic Revival building was designed by architect Isaac G. Perry and reflects the ambitions of the prosperous residents of the town of that period.

== Gallery ==
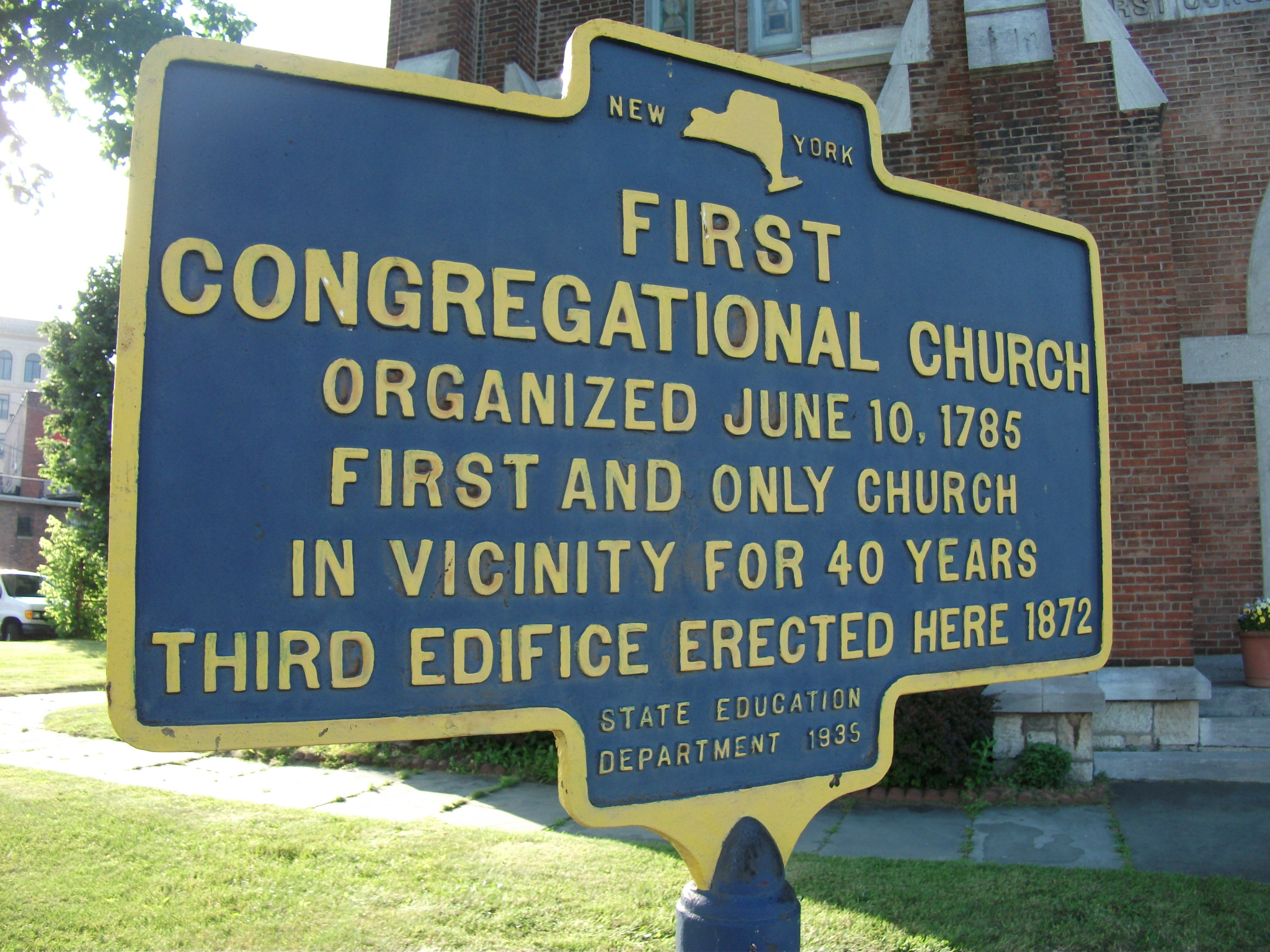
First Congregational Church Historical Marker, June 2011
