= Scotchtown, New York =

- Hamlet and CDP
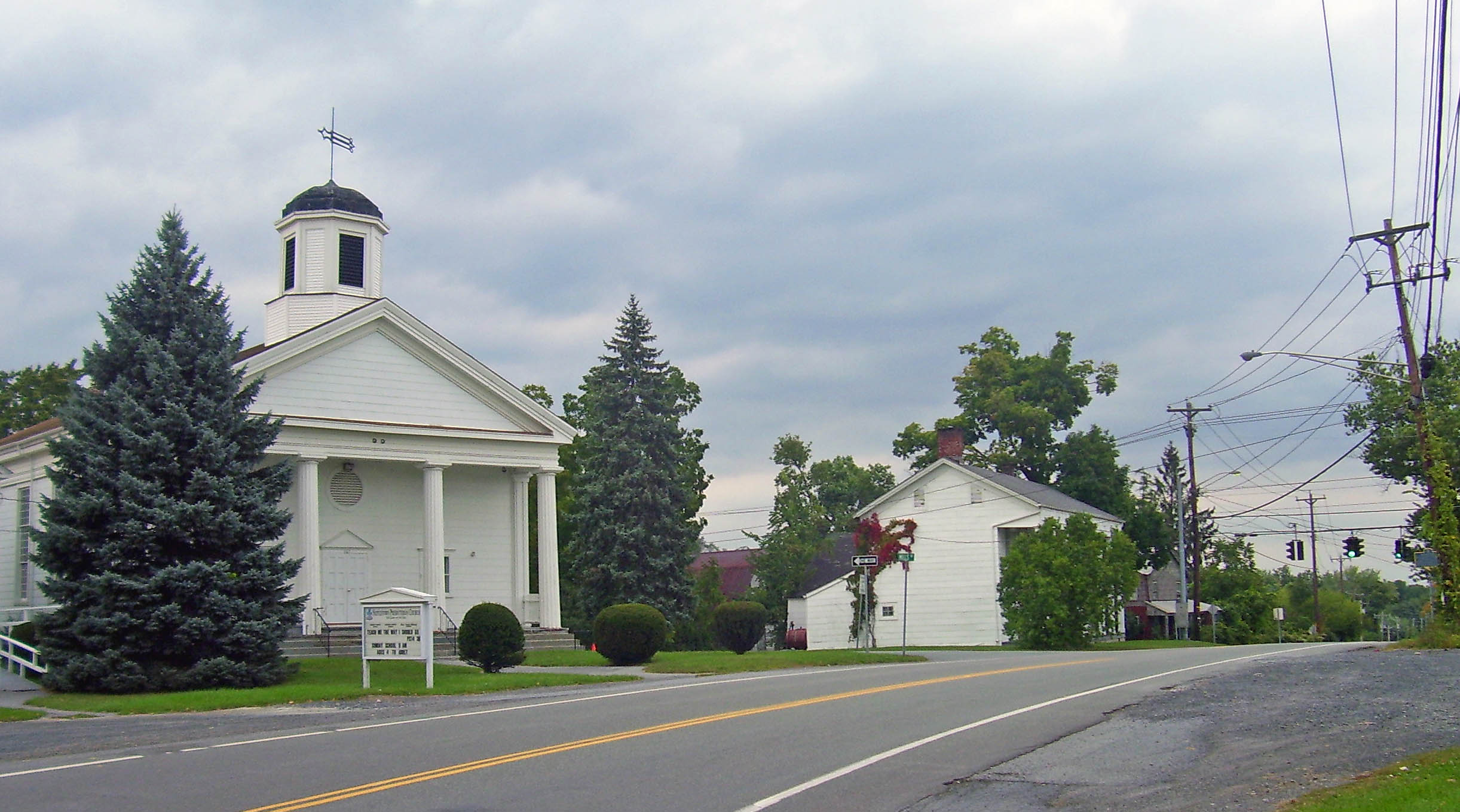
- Church and other buildings at the historic center of Scotchtown, at Scotchtown Road and Alvaran Ln

- Location in Orange County and the state of New York.

- Location within the state of New York Scotchtown, New York (the United States)
- Coordinates: 41°28′N 74°22′W
- Country: United States
- State: New York
- County: Orange
- Town: Wallkill

Area
  - Total: 4.85 sq mi (12.56 km^{2})
  - Land: 4.84 sq mi (12.53 km^{2})
  - Water: 0.012 sq mi (0.03 km^{2})
- Elevation: 720 ft (220 m)

Population (2020)
  - Total: 10,578
  - Density: 2,186.8/sq mi (844.31/km^{2})
- Time zone: UTC-5 (Eastern (EST))
  - Summer (DST): UTC-4 (EDT)
- ZIP Code: 10941
- Area code: 845
- FIPS code: 36-65882
- GNIS feature ID: 0964670

Scotchtown is a hamlet (and census-designated place) in the Town of Wallkill, in Orange County, New York, United States. The population was 10,578 at the 2020 census. It has the ZIP Code 10941. The hamlet is located east of the City of Middletown. It is part of the Kiryas Joel–Poughkeepsie–Newburgh, NY Metropolitan Statistical Area as well as the larger New York–Newark–Bridgeport, NY-NJ-CT-PA Combined Statistical Area.

The Mills Industrial Park at 874 Silver Lake Scotchtown Road (41°28′39″N 74°21′49″W) was the original planned location for the 1969 Woodstock Festival; however, after the Town of Walkill's board voted against holding the festival, it was moved to Bethel, where it was held less than a month later.

== Geography ==
Scotchtown is located at 41°28′N 74°22′W (41.4732, -74.3663).

According to the United States Census Bureau, the CDP has a total area of 4.2 square miles (11 km^{2}), all land.

== Demographics ==
Historical population
Census	Pop.	Note	%±
1970	2,119		—
1980	7,352		247.0%
1990	8,765		19.2%
2000	8,954		2.2%
2010	9,212		2.9%
2020	10,578		14.8%
U.S. Decennial Census

=== 2020 census ===
As of the 2020 census, Scotchtown had a population of 10,578. The median age was 38.2 years. 22.7% of residents were under the age of 18 and 13.5% of residents were 65 years of age or older. For every 100 females there were 93.6 males, and for every 100 females age 18 and over there were 91.4 males age 18 and over.

99.5% of residents lived in urban areas, while 0.5% lived in rural areas.

There were 3,868 households in Scotchtown, of which 34.1% had children under the age of 18 living in them. Of all households, 45.4% were married-couple households, 17.1% were households with a male householder and no spouse or partner present, and 28.8% were households with a female householder and no spouse or partner present. About 24.5% of all households were made up of individuals and 8.6% had someone living alone who was 65 years of age or older.

There were 4,054 housing units, of which 4.6% were vacant. The homeowner vacancy rate was 1.6% and the rental vacancy rate was 4.6%.

Racial composition as of the 2020 census
Race	Number	Percent
White	4,551	43.0%
Black or African American	2,626	24.8%
American Indian and Alaska Native	81	0.8%
Asian	526	5.0%
Native Hawaiian and Other Pacific Islander	1	0.0%
Some other race	1,319	12.5%
Two or more races	1,474	13.9%
Hispanic or Latino (of any race)	3,231	30.5%

=== 2000 census ===
As of the census of 2000, there were 8,954 people, 3,211 households, and 2,334 families residing in the CDP. The population density was 2,114.6 inhabitants per square mile (816.5/km^{2}). There were 3,345 housing units at an average density of 789.9/sq mi (305.0/km^{2}). The racial makeup of the CDP was 76.38% White, 11.48% African American, 0.26% Native American, 3.54% Asian, 0.04% Pacific Islander, 4.65% from other races, and 3.65% from two or more races. Hispanic or Latino of any race were 14.71% of the population.

There were 3,211 households, out of which 39.0% had children under the age of 18 living with them, 56.8% were married couples living together, 12.5% had a female householder with no husband present, and 27.3% were non-families. 21.3% of all households were made up of individuals, and 4.9% had someone living alone who was 65 years of age or older. The average household size was 2.78 and the average family size was 3.29.

In the CDP, the population was spread out, with 27.7% under the age of 18, 7.7% from 18 to 24, 31.9% from 25 to 44, 25.2% from 45 to 64, and 7.5% who were 65 years of age or older. The median age was 35 years. For every 100 females, there were 94.7 males. For every 100 females age 18 and over, there were 90.1 males.

The median income for a household in the CDP was $53,460, and the median income for a family was $59,439. Males had a median income of $44,482 versus $29,939 for females. The per capita income for the CDP was $22,282. About 5.3% of families and 5.2% of the population were below the poverty line, including 4.5% of those under age 18 and 9.6% of those age 65 or over.

== Michigan Corners ==
Michigan Corners (41°28′01″N 074°20′52″W) is a hamlet near Scotchtown east of Middletown, located at the corner of New York State Route 211 and Goshen Turnpike (Orange County Route 110).

There is no sign marking Michigan Corners, although it does appear on local maps. According to legend, the hamlet got its name from a landowner named Malcolm McLaughlin, who found himself in debt and skipped town around 1825. He was away for some time, and when he returned he told everyone he had gone to Michigan. McLaughlin later opened a tavern at this place, and his neighbors referred to his establishment as "Michigan".

== Education ==
The CDP is divided between Pine Bush Central School District, Middletown City School District, and Goshen Central School District.
