= Randall Airport =

- IATA: none; ICAO: none; FAA LID: 06N

Summary
- Airport type: Public
- Owner: Aerodrome Dev Corp
- Location: Middletown, New York, United States
- Elevation AMSL: 523 ft (159 m)
- Coordinates: 41°25′54.88″N 074°23′29.62″W

Map
- Location of airport in New York / United States 06N (the United States)

Runways
Direction	Length		Surface
Direction	ft	m	Surface
08/26	2,811	857	Asphalt

Statistics (2006)
- Aircraft operations: 22,504
- Based aircraft: 43
- Source: Federal Aviation Administration

Randall Airport (FAA LID: 06N) is a public use airport in Orange County, New York, United States. It is owned by Aerodrome Dev Corp and is located two nautical miles (3.74 km) southeast of the central business district of the City of Middletown. According to the FAA's National Plan of Integrated Airport Systems for 2007–2011, it is categorized as a reliever airport.

Although most U.S. airports use the same three-letter location identifier for the FAA and IATA, this airport is assigned 06N by the FAA but has no designation from the IATA.

== Facilities and aircraft ==
Randall Airport covers an area of 77 acres (31 ha) at an elevation of 523 feet (159 m) above mean sea level. It has one runway designated 08/26 with an asphalt surface measuring 2,811 by 60 feet (857 by 18 m).

For the 12-month period ending August 6, 2006, the airport had 22,504 aircraft operations, an average of 27 per day: 100% general aviation with a few ultralights. At that time there were 43 aircraft based at this airport: 47% single-engine, 44% gliders and 9% ultralights.

== Accidents and incidents ==
On December 14, 2006, a white-and-red Cessna 172 tried to land his aircraft, but he skidded and crashed into trees 1,000 feet past the end of the runway. The pilot came with non-life threatening injuries and was transported to the hospital by ambulance.

On May 5, 2018, an Aeronca 7AC crashed off Dolsontown Road, in the nearby town of Wawayanda shortly after taking off from Randall. The pilot, Rabbi Aaron D. Panken, president of Hebrew Union College-Jewish Institute of Religion, was killed; the other passenger, a flight instructor, survived with injuries that were not life-threatening.

On July 31, 2021, an LiteFlite Dragonfly ultralight/experimental tow plane experienced an engine power loss shortly after takeoff around 50 feet above ground level. Due to the drag from the hang glider tow line, the aircraft stalled and pancaked into the ground before ground-looping into a parked snowplow on the ramp

== See also ==
- List of airports in New York
