= Enlarged City School District of Middletown =

School district in New York, United States

The Enlarged City School District of Middletown serves the City of Middletown, Orange County, New York, and adjacent areas.

It operates seven schools:

- Presidential Park Elementary School - Grades K-5
- Maple Hill Elementary School - Grades K-5
- Truman Moon Elementary School - Grades K-5
- William A. Carter Elementary School - Grades K-5
- Monhagen Middle School - Grades 6-8
- Twin Towers Middle School - Grades 6-8
- Middletown High School - Grades 9-12
