= Andrew Rehfeld =

American political scientist and academic administrator

10th President of Hebrew Union College - Jewish Institute of Religion
- Incumbent
- Assumed office April 2019
- Preceded by: Aaron D. Panken; David Ellenson (interim)

Personal details
- Born: December 28, 1965 (age 60) Baltimore, Maryland, U.S.
- Spouse: Miggie Greenberg
- Children: 2
- Education: University of Rochester (BA); University of Chicago (MPP, PhD)
- Scientific career
- Fields: Political science
- Workplaces: University of Chicago; Washington University in St. Louis; Hebrew Union College
- Thesis: Silence of the Land: An Historical and Normative Analysis of Territorial Political Representation in the United States. (2000)
- Doctoral advisor: Cass Sunstein

Andrew Rehfeld, Ph.D., is an American political scientist who is serving as the 10th and current President of Hebrew Union College - Jewish Institute of Religion. He is also the HUC-JIR Professor of Political Thought. His research has focused primarily on the concepts and history of political representation; exploring how institutional design and reform (e.g., of voting, redistricting, and qualifications for office) can strengthen democracy and advance justice.

== Education ==
Rehfeld graduated magna cum laude from the University of Rochester in 1989 with a B.A. in philosophy, and was inducted into Phi Beta Kappa. In 1994, he earned a Master of Public Policy at the Harris School of Public Policy at the University of Chicago. He earned his Ph.D. in political sciences at the University of Chicago in 2000 under the direction of Cass Sunstein (chair), Charles Larmore, and Susan Stokes.

== Career ==
Following his graduation from the University of Rochester in 1989, Rehfeld began an early career in Jewish communal service, working for the Union for Reform Judaism in New Jersey, and serving with Rabbi Leon Morris in Mumbai, India, and Eastern Europe as part of the Jewish Service Corps of the American Jewish Joint Distribution Committee.

From 2001 to 2019, Rehfeld was a member of the faculty at Washington University in St. Louis, where he held a primary appointment in the department of political science and (from 2007 to 2010) served as its director of undergraduate studies. He held secondary appointments in Social Thought and Analysis, American Studies, and a courtesy appointment in Law. He was awarded a Fulbright scholarship in 2011, and has held visiting faculty appointments at the University of Chicago and Libera Università Internazionale degli Studi Sociali "Guido Carli" (LUISS) in Rome. In 2002, Rehfeld founded and directed the interdisciplinary workshop on politics, ethics, and society (WPES) at Washington University in St. Louis.

In 2012, Rehfeld was appointed the 12th President and CEO of the Jewish Federation of St. Louis, serving until 2019. He reoriented the institution toward a collaborative, community-development approach, and successfully launched a campaign to rebuild the St. Louis Kaplan Feldman Holocaust Museum.

== Hebrew Union College Presidency ==
Rehfeld was elected as the 10th President of Hebrew Union College - Jewish Institute of Religion in December 2018 and began service in April 2019. A formal inauguration ceremony was held in the historic Plum Street Temple in Cincinnati, OH, now the Isaac M. Wise Temple, on October 27, 2019. Rehfeld is the first lay person (non-rabbi) to serve in the position. In his Inaugural Address, President Rehfeld stated, “HUC drives the development of ideas and leadership that strengthen the Jewish Public Sphere: the institutions that form the canvas of communal life upon which we as a people realize our collective values to serve the highest Good and the Holy, and lead our world to Justice.” Reflecting on the changing Jewish community, he noted, “Our Jewish communities are becoming far more diverse than in the past. We are multi-racial; inter-faith; inter-denominational; non-denominational; inter-gendered; inter-oriented; multi-ideological. We must prepare our students to lead communities who are themselves not always ready to embrace this change.”

In partnership with Hebrew Union College's Board of Governors, Rehfeld is leading a strategic planning process focused on five key goals: advancing educational excellence, strengthening student support, growing our impact, achieving fiscal sustainability, and ensuring a sacred and respectful culture. He stated, “We are planning for a meaningful and sustainable future -- a future where Judaism thrives because of the extraordinary leaders we bring forth. We are at a crossroads. We recognize that change is inevitable and we welcome it. Our vision and determination will secure our promising Jewish future.”

Rehfeld is a staunch advocate for sacred and respectful environments at Hebrew Union College, stating, “We must continue to combat all abuses of power, bias, and discrimination, including on the basis of race, religion, gender, sexual orientation, gender identity, physical or mental disabilities, national origin, and other important personal characteristics. It is our sacred responsibility to create a safe and respectful environment at the College-Institute, recognizing that all of us, in all of our diversity, are created b’tzelem Elohim, in the image of God.” Under his leadership he has initiated two significant reviews of the culture at HUC, including leading HUC's Board to engage in a process of reconciliation, that resulted as a first step to the historic Morgan Lewis Investigation Report of November 2022.

Rehfeld is deeply committed to the academic environment as a venue for fostering difficult conversations as articulated in his 2009 Convocation Address at Washington University.

He has written widely on issues of social justice and Jewish ethical values, the challenges of the pandemic, and seminary education. He has lectured on liberal Judaism and Zionism and the future of seminary education, and has championed HUC's commitment to Israel and the Jerusalem campus's programs training Israeli Reform clergy and pluralistic educators, advancing tolerance and understanding among Jewish, Muslim, and Christian educators in Jerusalem, and educating North American rabbinical, cantorial, and education students to build bridges of mutual responsibility with world Jewry.

== Personal life ==
Rehfeld was born in Baltimore, MD, and spent his early childhood raised in Ventnor, NJ. His mother, Beverly Rehfeld, an accomplished Public Relations professional, was the founder of the Atlantic County Citizens Council on the Environment. His father, R. Rex Rehfeld, was a career military officer, serving as a Captain in the U.S. Army during the Korean war from 1950 to 1951. He resigned his commission as Major in 1963 and was an investment advisor until his retirement in 2015. His stepmother, Ruth Wolf Rehfeld, (d. 2003) was born in Aachen, Germany and fled with her immediate family in 1939, losing most of her other relatives to the concentration camps. She was a leader in the Baltimore civic and Jewish community, serving as the founding director of the Northwest Baltimore corporation, and founding the Baltimore BLEWS, a group promoting dialogue between Blacks and Jews.

Rehfeld is married to Dr. Miggie Greenberg and they have two children.

== Selected publications ==
- Andrew Rehfeld - google scholar

2017. "On Representing". Journal of Political Philosophy. (Peer reviewed article) June.

2018. "Representation and the US Constitution". In, Cambridge Companion to the US Constitution. Karen Oren and John Chapman, Eds. New York: Cambridge University Press. (Book chapter)

2011 "The Child as Democratic Citizen". Annals of the American Academy of Political and Social Science (Vol. 633, January 2011)

2010 "Offensive Political Theory Perspectives on Politics. Vol. 8. June. 465–486

2008 "Jephthah, the Hebrew Bible, and John Locke's Second Treatise on Government". Hebraic Political Studies (3:1 Winter 2008)

2005 The Concept of Constituency: Political Representation, Democratic Legitimacy and Institutional Design. (Cambridge: Cambridge University Press 2005)

== Additional speeches, writings, and videos ==
http://huc.edu/about/presidents-office/president-rehfelds-speecheswritings
