= Middletown High School (New York) =

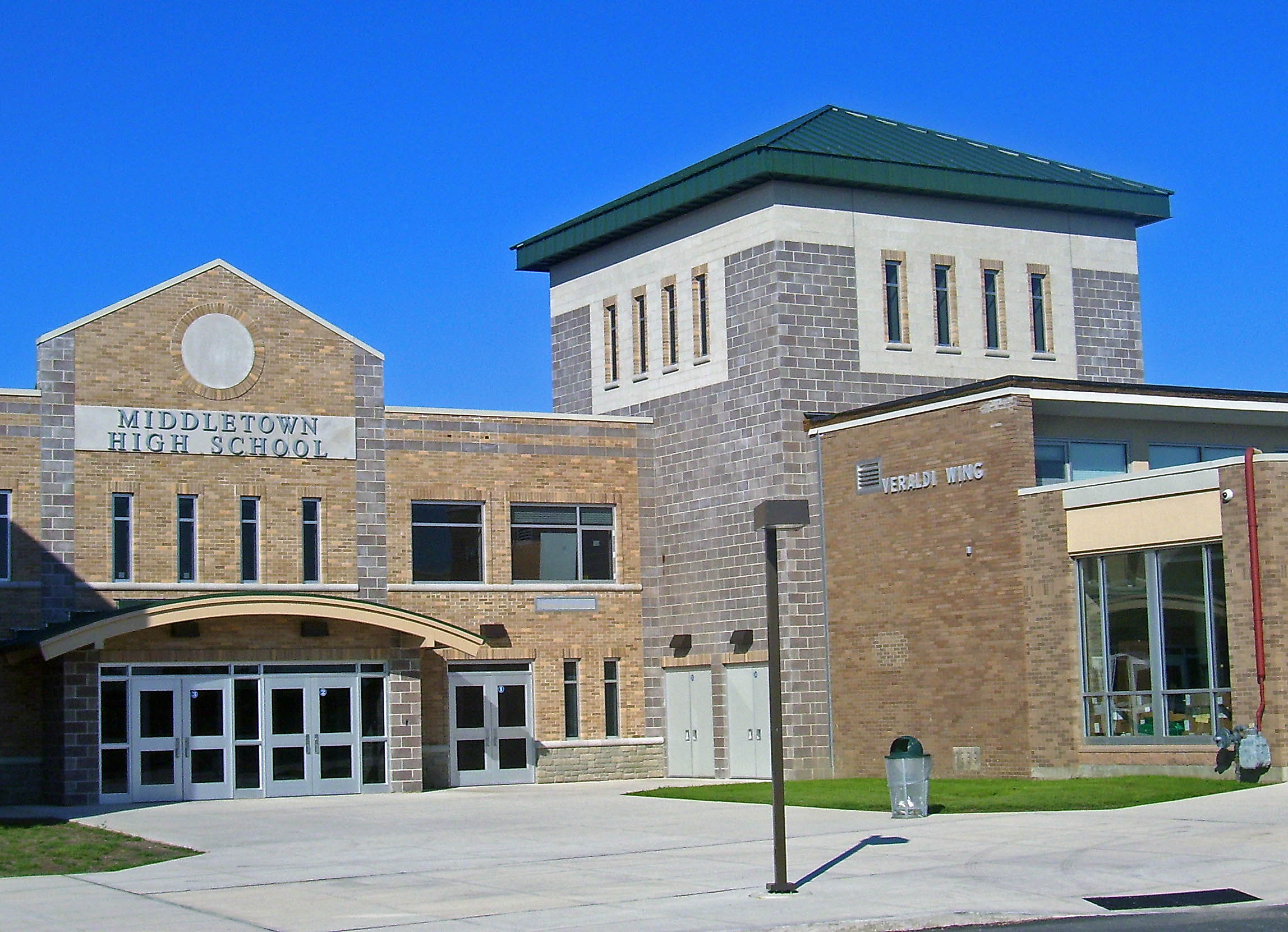

Location
- 30 Gardner Ext Ave; Middletown, Orange County, New York 12302; 41.4517°N 74.3984°W

Information
- School type: Public, high school
- School district: Enlarged City School District of Middletown
- Principal: William Donohue
- Staff: 140
- Grades: 9-12
- Enrollment: 2,551 (2023-2024)
- Language: English
- Colors: Blue and white
- Mascot: Bear
- Team name: Middie Bears
- Rivals: Port Jervis High School, Newburgh Free Academy, Pine Bush High School
- Communities served: Middletown; Town of Wallkill (part); Town of Wawayanda (part)
- Feeder schools: Twin Towers Middle School, Monhagen Middle School
- Website: mhs.middletowncityschools.org

Middletown High School serves 9th through 12th grade students in the Enlarged City School District of Middletown, which covers that city as well as adjacent portions of the towns of Wallkill and Wawayanda in Orange County, New York, United States. It is located on Gardner Avenue in a small outlying area of the city, near the county fairgrounds on a small rise south of NY 211.

The school, formerly Anthony Veraldi Junior High School, built in 1959, replaced the building now known as Twin Towers Middle School as the district's high school in 1976 after a major expansion. It has been expanded at least four times since then.

== Recent years ==
=== 2000s controversies ===
The school has been at the center of a number of controversies in the last several years. When former district superintendent Robert Sigler was investigated and convicted in 2003 for sexually abusing a male student, then-principal Bernard Cohen was suspended by the school board (with pay) and barred from school-related events for allegedly not doing enough to prevent it, and other allegations against him. These included under reporting violence and complaints at the school (involving students, teachers and him), falsifying records in a corrupt manner, putting students who dropped out or got expelled under the "transferred schools" category, and last but not least, unethically accepting money and/or other bribes and favors in return for getting students diplomas who didn't meet NY state requirements. He claimed it was retaliation for his testimony before the county grand jury investigating the abuse and that he was being scapegoated. Students claiming to be sympathetic to him organized a protest walkout, spoke in his behalf at board meetings and then helped campaign during the ensuing elections, in which two incumbents were defeated, Cohen denied having anything to do with this. Four years later, the school district settled with Cohen for $425,000.

The 2005 school year began chaotically when many students received incorrect class schedules or none at all due to problems implementing a new computer program, (some called it Cohen's revenge as he still had influence at the school) and continued as ongoing construction did not run smoothly and disrupted the school. Students again staged a walkout over a number of their concerns that they believed were not being taken seriously by the district administration, such as overcrowding and safety issues. Cohen's replacement, Larry Ashley, resigned three months into the school year, citing health problems.

Later that month, the district sought to fire tenured art teacher Peter Panse, who had offered his senior students a nude figure drawing class taught off-campus as a way to improve their portfolios and chances for scholarships at art schools. Very few of his students supported him, but many claimed they had felt pressured into taking the class. The district argued Panse had a conflict of interest, since he personally profited from the students taking the class. After lengthy litigation, in January 2007 a state administrative law judge ruled that he should have been suspended for only 15 days and ordered him reinstated.

The beginning of the 2007-08 school year also saw some more scheduling problems, with new textbooks ordered only the week before school opened and many teachers not knowing their own schedules.

== Student body ==
Enrollment at Middletown High School was 2,551 students as of 2024. The student body was made up of 1,565 Hispanic students, 594 black students, 247 white students, 52 Asian students, and 85 students of two or more races. The school is classified as an inner city district and high poverty district, with every student registered for free lunch. Middletown had 193 full-time teachers, with a student-teacher ratio of 13 to 1. Average class size at Middletown was roughly 24.

== Athletics ==
The Middletown Middies football team shares a historic rivalry with the Port Jervis High School Red Raiders, named the Erie Bell game after the trophy, which is an old railroad bell from the Port Jervis-Middletown line. The game is an alternating home-and-away series and started in 1897. Middletown leads the series 72-58-7 as of 2015, and has won three of the last four games. Beginning in 2014, the game is on the list of U.S. Marines Great American Rivalry games.

Middletown's boys basketball team is highly regarded in the state, and during the 2011–2012 school year the team went to the final four of the state playoffs. The Middies returned to the playoffs in 2015–2016, making the state finals and losing to Aquinas Institute. The team has a rivalry with the Newburgh Free Academy Goldbacks from nearby Newburgh.

Middletown's track and field team is nationally recognized and has produced a number of successful college athletes and state and national qualifiers. The boys 4x400 meter relay team won a national championship in 2011.

Middletown's tennis program is regarded as one of the best in New York state among public high schools.

== Alumni ==
- Aaron Tveit – actor
- Mike Avilés – baseball player
- M. Paul Friedberg – landscape architect
- Benjamin A. Gilman – former U.S. Congressman and Chairman of the United States House Committee on Foreign Affairs
- Kendrick Ray – basketball player for Maccabi Tel Aviv
- Joseph J. Romm – scientist
- Omari Spellman – NBA player for the Atlanta Hawks, attended for ninth grade
