= Middletown, New York =

- City
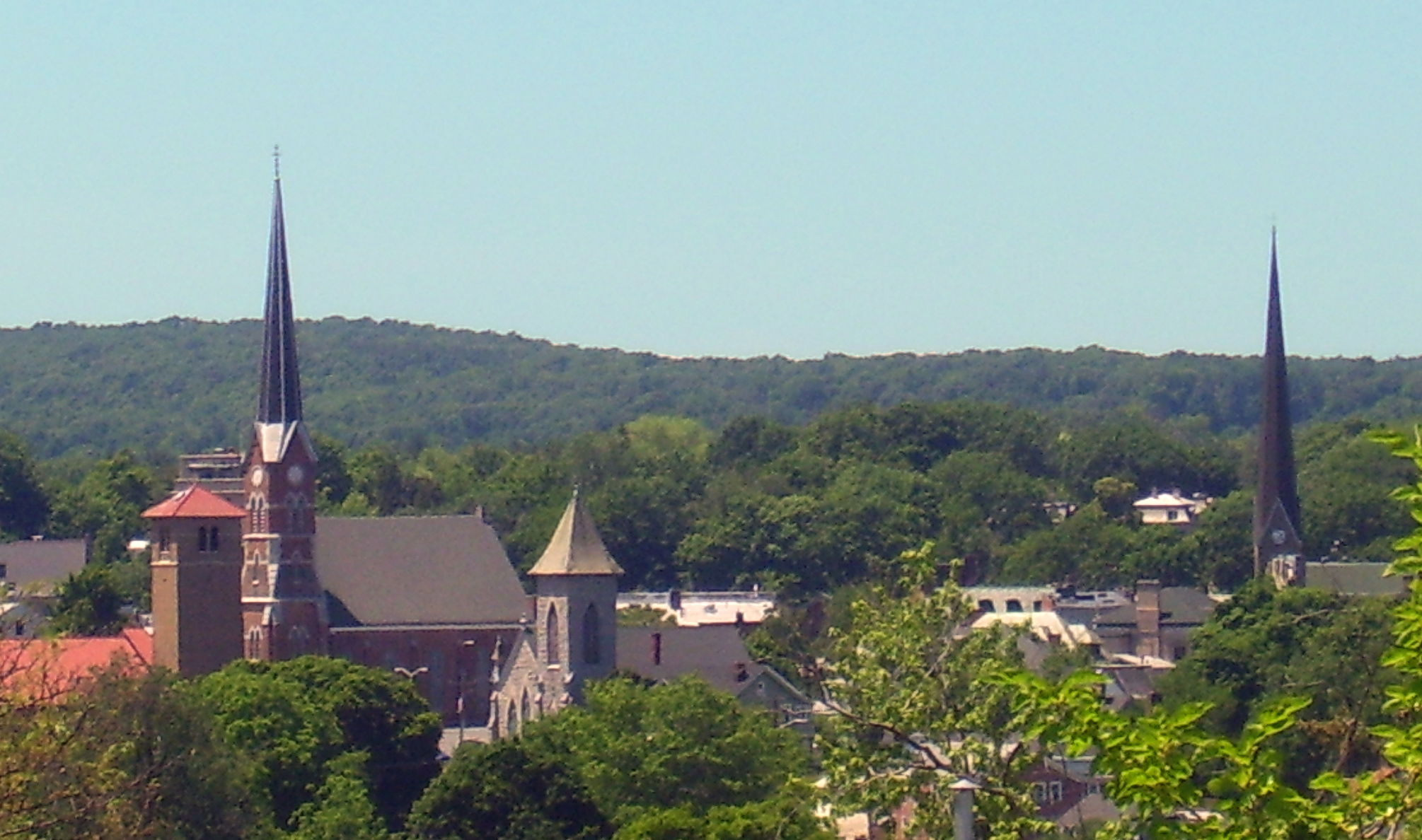
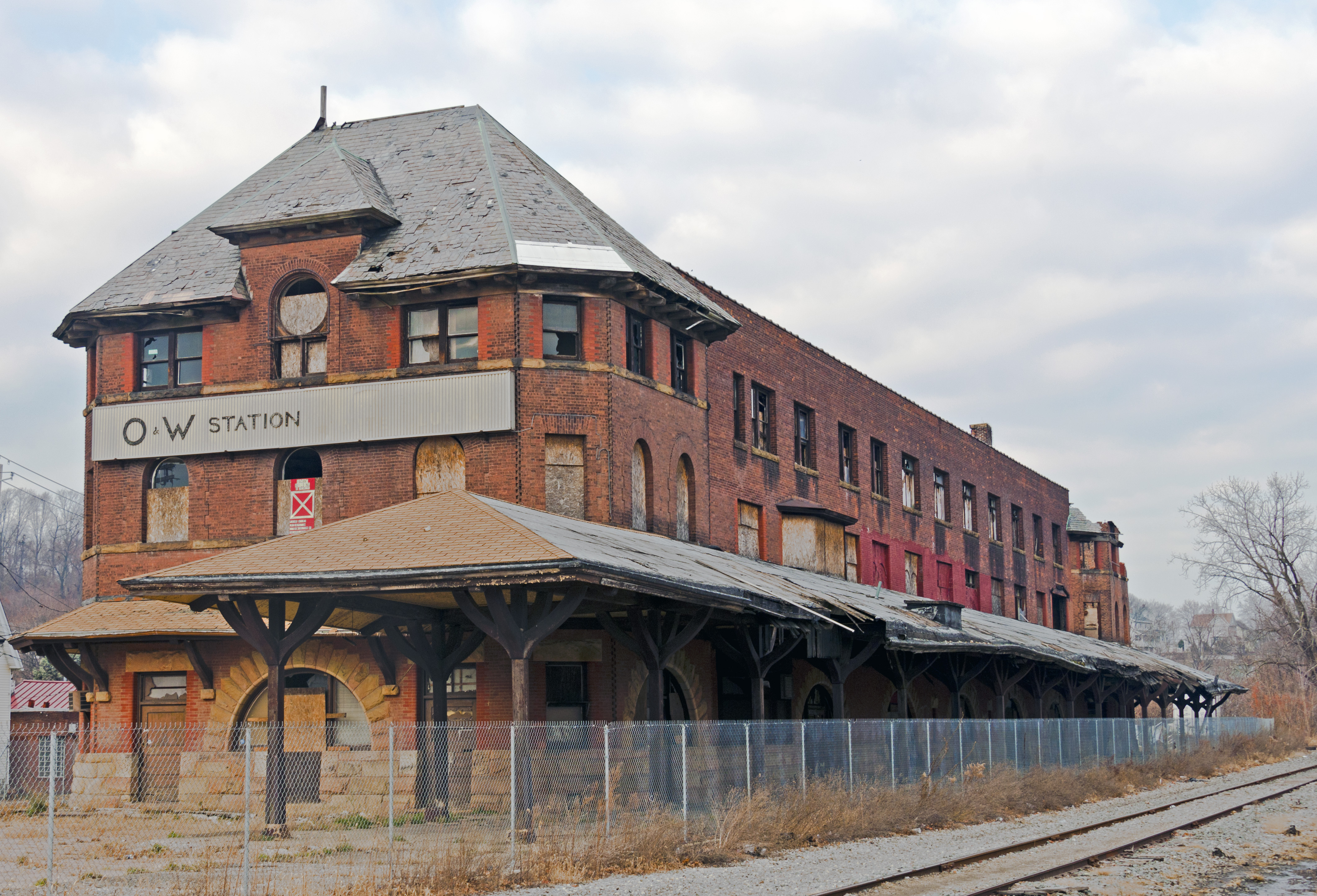
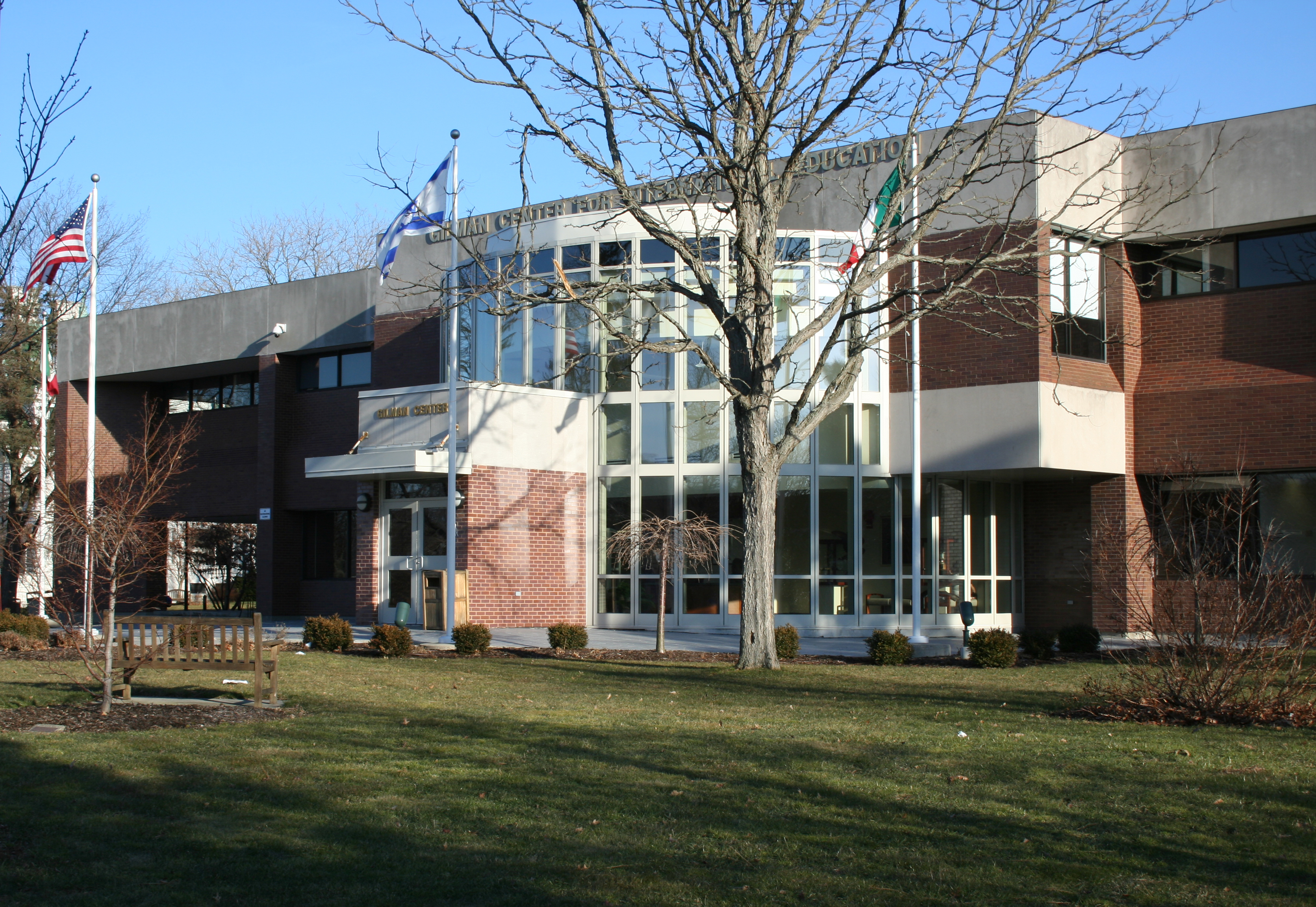
- From top, left to right: Skyline of Middletown; O&W Station; Gilman Center

- Seal
- Interactive map of Middletown, New York
- Coordinates: 41°27′N 74°25′W
- Country: United States
- State: New York
- County: Orange
- Incorporation as village: May 15, 1848; 178 years ago
- Incorporation as city: October 9, 1888; 137 years ago

Government
  - Type: Mayor–council
  - Mayor: Joseph M. DeStefano (D)

Area
  - Total: 5.33 sq mi (13.81 km^{2})
  - Land: 5.31 sq mi (13.74 km^{2})
  - Water: 0.027 sq mi (0.07 km^{2})
- Elevation: 520 ft (160 m)
- Highest elevation (North boundary along Kennedy Terrace): 740 ft (230 m)
- Lowest elevation (Unnamed tributary of Monhagen Brook along south boundary): 460 ft (140 m)

Population (2020)
  - Total: 30,345
  - Density: 5,719.5/sq mi (2,208.31/km^{2})
- Time zone: UTC−5 (EST)
  - Summer (DST): UTC−4 (EDT)
- ZIP Code: 10940
- Area codes: 845
- FIPS code: 36-47042
- Wikimedia Commons: Middletown, New York
- Website: www.middletownny.gov

Middletown is the largest city in Orange County, New York, United States. It lies in New York's Hudson Valley region, near the Wallkill River and the foothills of the Shawangunk Mountains. Middletown is situated between Port Jervis and Newburgh, New York. At the 2020 United States census, the city's population was 30,345, reflecting an increase of 2,259 from the 28,086 counted in the 2010 census. The ZIP Code is 10940. Middletown falls within the Kiryas Joel–Poughkeepsie–Newburgh Metropolitan Statistical Area, which belongs to the larger New York–Newark–Bridgeport, NY–NJ–CT–PA Combined Statistical Area.

Middletown was incorporated as a city in 1888. It grew in the 19th and early 20th centuries as a stop on several lower New York State railroads, attracting several small manufacturing businesses. SUNY Orange, the Times-Herald Record, U.S. Postal Service, County of Orange, Touro College of Osteopathic Medicine, Orange & Rockland Utilities, and the City of Middletown are major employers in Middletown. Many residents also work at the Galleria at Crystal Run, Walmart, Media Communications Corp, and Garnet Health in the nearby Town of Wallkill.

== History ==
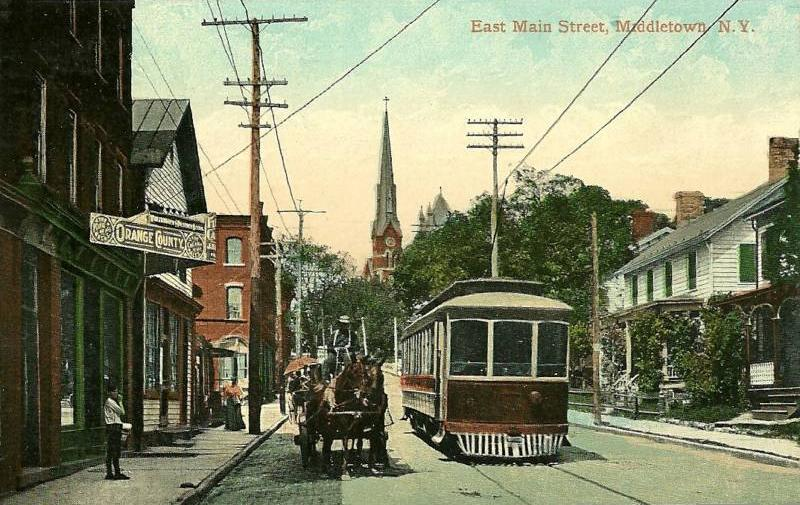
East Main Street in 1909

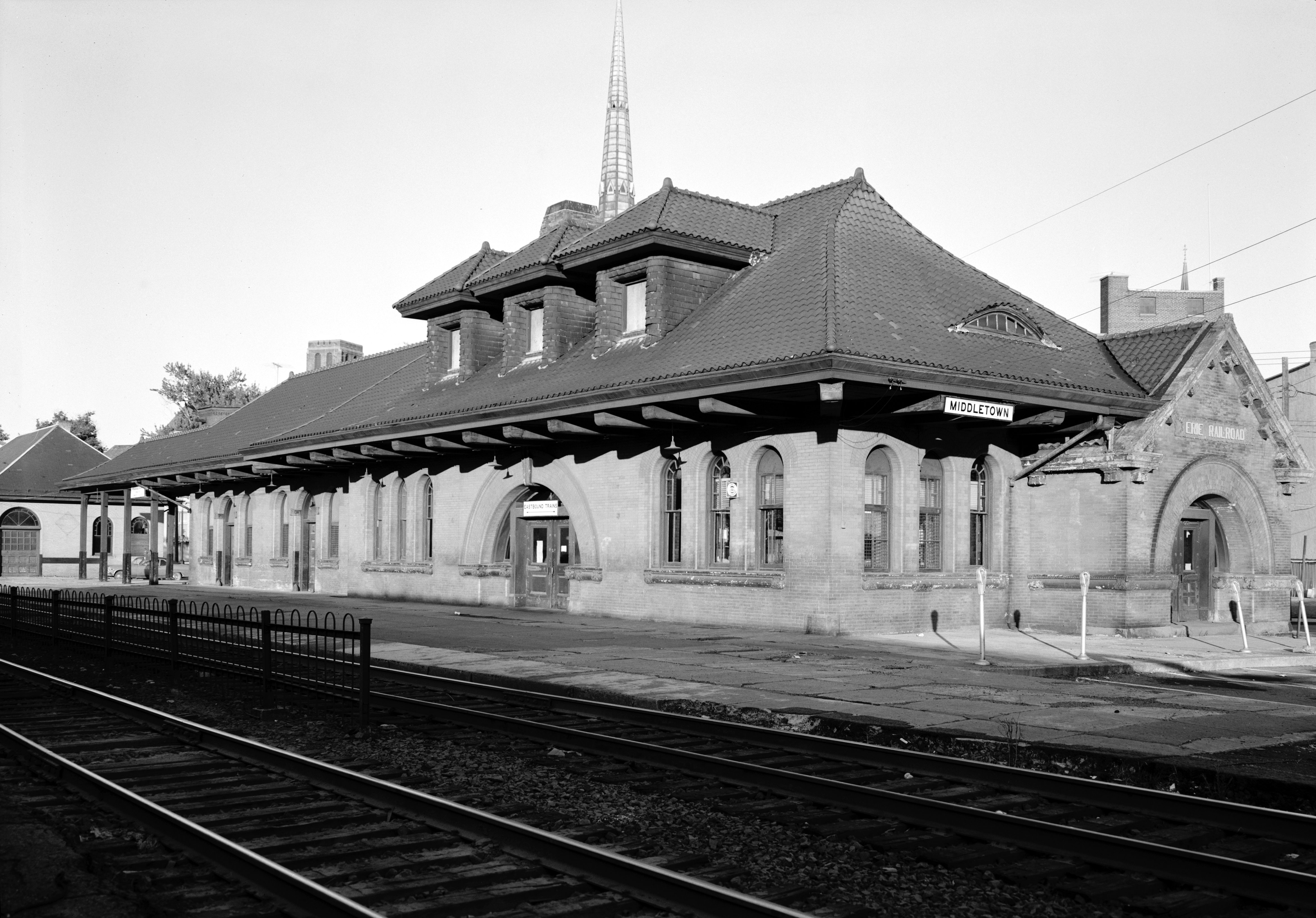
The Erie Railroad's Middletown Station in 1971, now Thrall Library

=== Early history ===
John Green purchased land from the DeLancey patent and probably settled the area around 1744. Due to its location between other settlements, residents adopted the name of Middletown, changing it later to South Middletown to avoid confusion with a nearby location. Eventually they dropped the word "south", using the current name when the community became a village in 1848. The village was incorporated as a city in 1888.

The First Congregational Church of Middletown, established in 1785, has the highest spire downtown. Construction of its first building was a sign of Middletown becoming established as a village. Its current church building was constructed in 1872.

=== Growth ===
Middletown grew through the 19th century, stimulated by construction of the Erie Railroad and the New York, Ontario and Western Railway (among others). The city was industrialized, developing factories for various industries, such as shoes, lawnmower blades, and furniture. These did well through the World War II era.

The Webb Horton mansion and adjoining 18 acres were donated to establish Orange County Community College in 1950.

Due to industrial restructuring, most of the old manufacturing businesses had closed by the 1960s. In 1968, Middletown annexed the adjacent Village of Amchir. In the 1970s, the economy of Middletown and surrounding communities suffered additional blows due to the closing of a large Ford Motor Company plant in Mahwah, New Jersey, and the downsizing of IBM operations in the area.

Responding to higher housing costs in New York City, from the 1970s, New York City police officers, firefighters and other workers began to move to the area, as local housing offered better value. These commuters, who drove two hours each way, helped to bolster the economy of the area. After 1986, however, New York City required its municipal employees to reside in the city, and Middletown lost this source of residential development. The only railroad left in town is the Middletown and New Jersey Railway, a freight line. The population has continued to grow into the 21st century, while the economy has shifted largely to service and retail, with a regional medical center a major employer in the area.

=== Modern Middletown ===
The downtown business district of the City of Middletown has long hosted small businesses, professional offices, bars and restaurants, but in the second half of the 20th century it suffered from suburbanization that drew off retail businesses. The "Miracle Mile" shopping strip and Lloyd's Supermarket were developed in the late 1960s. as were two later shopping malls, all located in the nearby Town of Wallkill along Route 211, near the intersection of Route 17 and Interstate 84. The Orange Plaza mall in the Town of Wallkill drew several of the downtown shops into it by the mid-1970s, further weakening Middletown's downtown. After the Galleria at Crystal Run opened nearby in the early 1990s, Orange Plaza declined; it was demolished in 2001 and replaced by the Shoppes at Orange Plaza.

The downtown area has several historic churches. The Middletown City Hall and City Court are located on James Street. Prosperous neighborhoods include Presidential Heights. Highland Avenue is lined with large Victorian houses, some of the largest of which are now used as nursing homes. Other neighborhoods show the effects of loss of jobs and decline in the economy. The surrounding countryside was devoted partly to small dairy farms, but family farming has waned since the 1980s.

Middletown is the main business address for the newspaper Times Herald-Record and its owner, Local Media Group. Mediacom Communications Corp, a cable and other pay TV company, is headquartered outside the city in the Town of Wallkill. It is also a manufacturing location for Bell Flavors & Fragrances.

== Places of interest ==
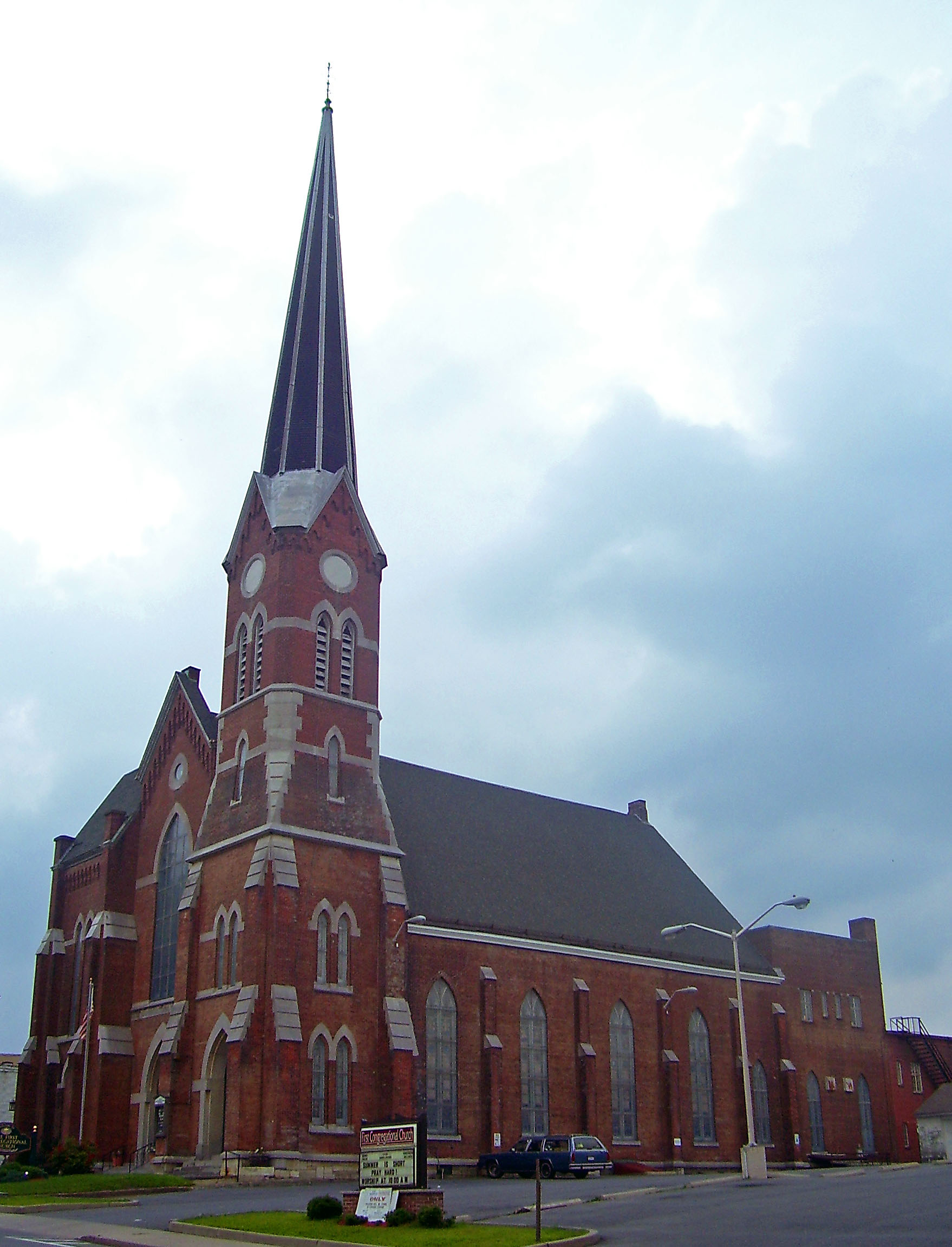
The First Congregational Church, built in 1872, has the tallest spire downtown.

The downtown area, particularly North and Main streets, has a variety of ethnic eateries and various small boutiques and thrift shops. Several churches are located in the neighborhood. The city has the single-screen, 1,100-seat Paramount Theatre, which also offers stage shows and concerts, a local arts council, a bowling alley, WALL and WOSR radio stations, Thrall Library and the Van Duzer Historical Society museum downtown.

Civic organizations include Boy Scouts of America and Girl Scouts of the USA chapters, as well as Lions Club, Elks Club, Kiwanis and Rotary Club. The Rotary Club runs a Horse Show at Fancher Davidge Park each fall. Middletown is the site of the Orange County Fair each summer and the Orange County Fair Speedway. Highland Lakes State Park is the nearest state park. Good choices for hiking, biking and country drives are nearby.

Shopping in the area includes the Galleria at Crystal Run, a mall just east of Middletown, and a long retail strip along Route 211 on the east side of town.

Middletown's Hillside Cemetery was designed by the British architect and landscape designer Calvert Vaux, who worked with Frederick Law Olmsted to design Central Park in New York City. The J. W. Chorley Elementary School, designed by the American architect Paul Rudolph, was built in the 1960s and demolished in 2013.

== Health care ==
Health care services are provided at Garnet Health Medical Center (formerly Orange Regional Medical Center), a hospital located in the town of Walkill. ORMC was completed in 2011, merging the faculties of the former Horton Medical Center and Arden Hill Hospital. It is a major employer in the region.

== Geography ==
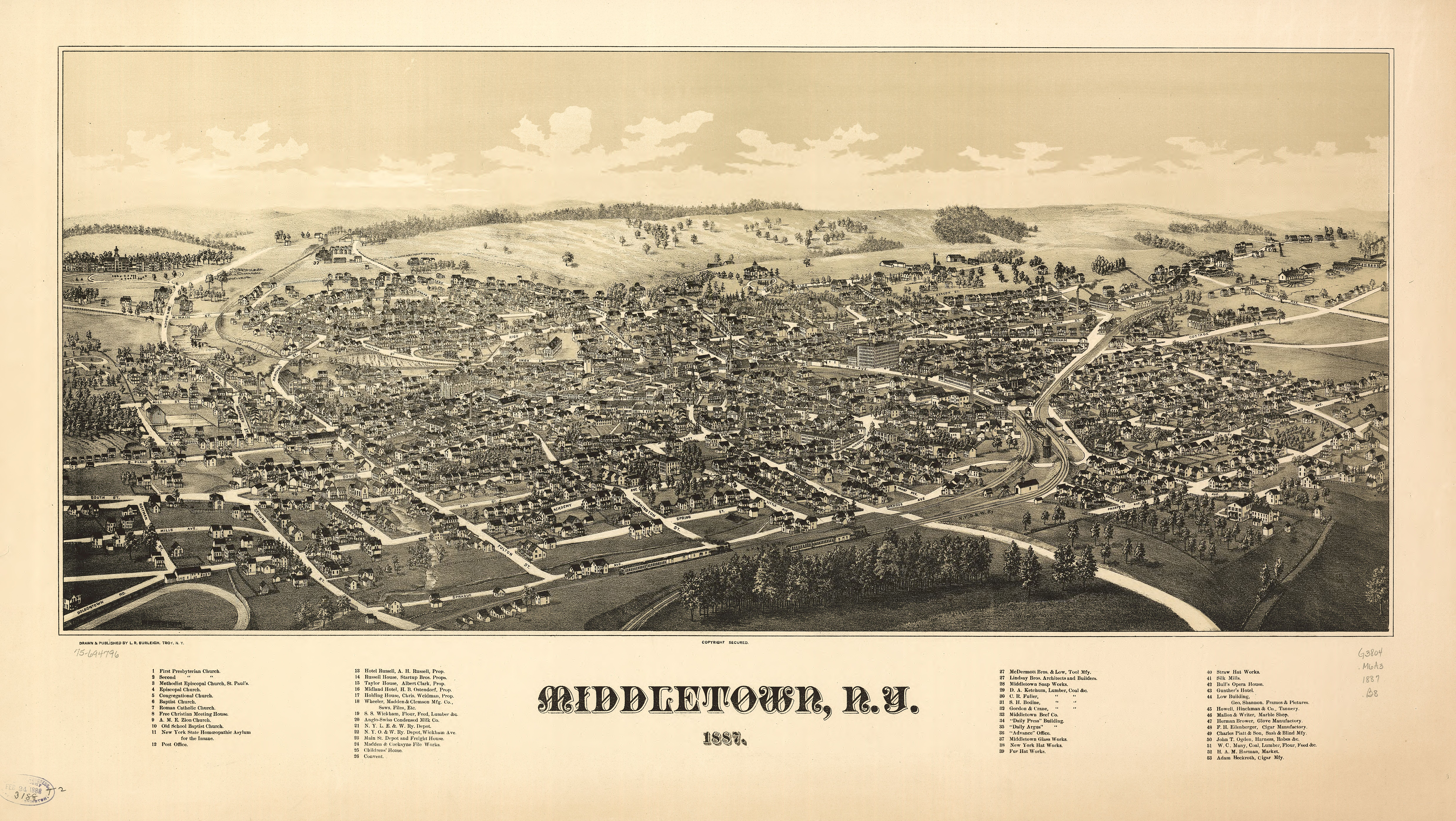
Perspective map of Middletown from 1887 with list of landmarks by L.R. Burleigh

Middletown is located at 41°27′N 74°25′W (41.4458, -74.4221) in Orange County. The city is nearly surrounded by the town of Wallkill, except for its southernmost section, which is in the town of Wawayanda.

According to the United States Census Bureau, the city has a total area of 5.2 square miles (13.3 km^{2}), of which 5.1 square miles (13.3 km^{2}) is land and 0.19% is water. The city is drained by Monhagen Brook and the Wallkill River.

=== Climate ===
Climate data for Middletown, Orange County, New York, 1991–2020 normals, extremes 1893–2011
Month	Jan	Feb	Mar	Apr	May	Jun	Jul	Aug	Sep	Oct	Nov	Dec	Year
Record high °F (°C)	66 (19)	73 (23)	85 (29)	92 (33)	95 (35)	97 (36)	102 (39)	97 (36)	100 (38)	88 (31)	78 (26)	71 (22)	102 (39)
Mean maximum °F (°C)	54.5 (12.5)	56.6 (13.7)	67.6 (19.8)	81.0 (27.2)	85.6 (29.8)	89.4 (31.9)	92.2 (33.4)	90.4 (32.4)	86.1 (30.1)	77.8 (25.4)	68.8 (20.4)	56.5 (13.6)	93.7 (34.3)
Mean daily maximum °F (°C)	34.1 (1.2)	37.4 (3.0)	46.8 (8.2)	59.6 (15.3)	70.2 (21.2)	78.0 (25.6)	82.4 (28.0)	80.6 (27.0)	73.4 (23.0)	62.3 (16.8)	50.0 (10.0)	38.7 (3.7)	59.5 (15.3)
Daily mean °F (°C)	26.0 (−3.3)	27.7 (−2.4)	36.2 (2.3)	48.5 (9.2)	59.3 (15.2)	67.6 (19.8)	72.3 (22.4)	70.5 (21.4)	63.4 (17.4)	52.5 (11.4)	41.4 (5.2)	31.4 (−0.3)	49.7 (9.9)
Mean daily minimum °F (°C)	17.8 (−7.9)	18.0 (−7.8)	25.6 (−3.6)	37.5 (3.1)	48.4 (9.1)	57.3 (14.1)	62.2 (16.8)	60.4 (15.8)	53.3 (11.8)	42.6 (5.9)	32.8 (0.4)	24.1 (−4.4)	40.0 (4.4)
Mean minimum °F (°C)	−0.4 (−18.0)	2.2 (−16.6)	9.1 (−12.7)	25.3 (−3.7)	26.5 (−3.1)	45.9 (7.7)	52.5 (11.4)	50.2 (10.1)	40.3 (4.6)	29.6 (−1.3)	19.9 (−6.7)	7.7 (−13.5)	−3.0 (−19.4)
Record low °F (°C)	−23 (−31)	−18 (−28)	−7 (−22)	13 (−11)	25 (−4)	38 (3)	38 (3)	41 (5)	27 (−3)	14 (−10)	10 (−12)	−21 (−29)	−23 (−31)
Average precipitation inches (mm)	2.59 (66)	2.09 (53)	3.02 (77)	4.03 (102)	3.80 (97)	4.62 (117)	4.19 (106)	4.49 (114)	4.27 (108)	4.55 (116)	3.21 (82)	3.54 (90)	44.40 (1,128)
Average precipitation days (≥ 0.01 in)	8.9	6.2	8.6	8.9	10.8	10.4	9.0	9.2	7.8	8.0	8.4	8.7	104.9
Source 1: NOAA
Source 2: XMACIS2 (mean maxima/minima 1981–2010)

== Transportation ==
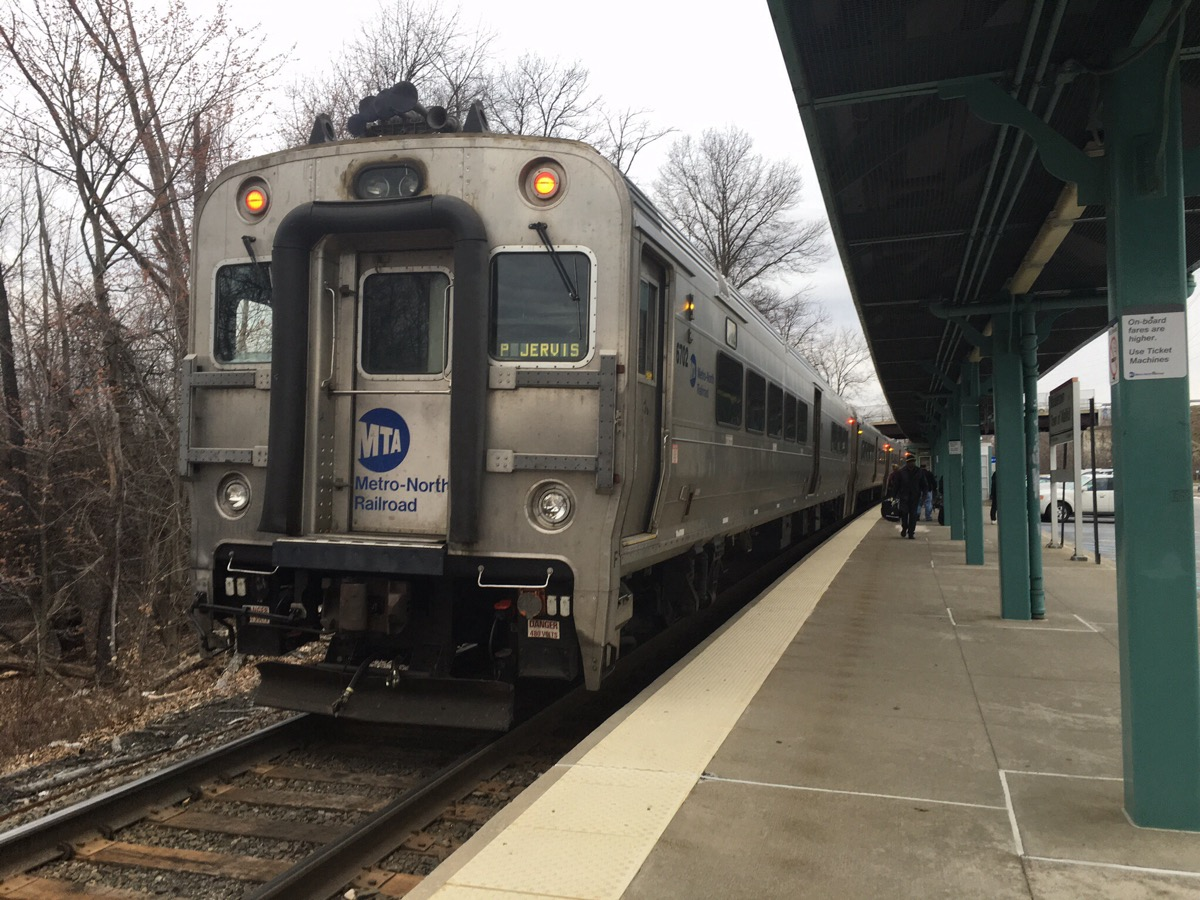
Middletown station is part of Metro-North Railroad's Port Jervis Line.

Middletown can be reached from New York City by bus and is located near the intersection of Interstate 84 and NY 17 (the future Interstate 86). State routes 17M and 211 run right through the city, and US 6 parallels I-84 to the south.

The Middletown-Town of Wallkill station on Metro-North Railroad's Port Jervis line is located nearby, in the Town of Wallkill, and provides rail service to Port Jervis, other communities in Orange and Rockland Counties and Bergen County, New Jersey, Hoboken and New York City via a transfer at Secaucus, New Jersey.

Randall Airport is about 4 miles (6.4 km) from the center of Middletown. (ID: 06N)

Middletown has a bus service, Middletown Transit, with four routes that connect at the bus station, located on Railroad Avenue, where passengers can connect to Coach USA and Short Line bus service. There is also a "Main Line" bus connecting to surrounding Orange County villages and another route connecting to areas such as Newburgh and Woodbury.

== Demographics ==
Historical population
Census	Pop.	Note	%±
1870	6,049		—
1880	8,494		40.4%
1890	11,977		41.0%
1900	14,522		21.2%
1910	15,313		5.4%
1920	18,420		20.3%
1930	21,276		15.5%
1940	21,908		3.0%
1950	22,586		3.1%
1960	23,475		3.9%
1970	22,607		−3.7%
1980	21,454		−5.1%
1990	24,160		12.6%
2000	25,388		5.1%
2010	28,086		10.6%
2020	30,345		8.0%
U.S. Decennial Census

As of the 2020 census, Middletown had a population of 30,345. The median age was 36.4 years. 24.1% of residents were under the age of 18 and 12.9% of residents were 65 years of age or older. For every 100 females there were 92.3 males, and for every 100 females age 18 and over there were 89.4 males age 18 and over. There were 11,011 households in Middletown, 34.0% of which included children under the age of 18, 34.8% of which were married couples, 20.8% were households with a male householder and no spouse or partner, and 35.7% were households with a female householder and no spouse or partner. About 29.7% of all households were made up of single individuals, and 11.4% had someone living alone who was 65 years of age or older. There were 11,980 housing units, of which 8.1% were vacant. The homeowner vacancy rate was 3.0%, and the rental vacancy rate was 5.8%.

Racial composition as of the 2020 census
Race	Number	Percent
White	9,983	32.9%
Black or African American	7,116	23.5%
American Indian and Alaska Native	424	1.4%
Asian	1,165	3.8%
Native Hawaiian and Other Pacific Islander	14	0.0%
Some other race	7,284	24.0%
Two or more races	4,359	14.4%
Hispanic or Latino (of any race)	13,243	43.6%

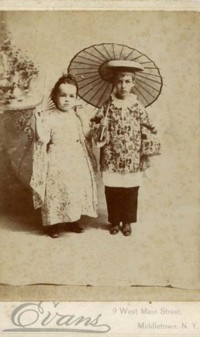
1896 photo of Arthur Fanshon and E. P. Nickinson, about age 6, in a production of The Mikado in Middletown

The population of the city has been growing and diversifying in the 21st century. At the 2000 census, there were 25,388 people, 9,466 households and 5,963 families residing in the city. The racial make-up was then 68.68% White and 15.13% African American. 25.11% identified as Hispanic or Latino (of any race). 40.0% were married couples, and 16.7% had a female householder with no husband present. 27.8% of the population were under the age of 18, 9.4% from 18 to 24, 31.0% from 25 to 44, 19.9% from 45 to 64 and 12.0% were 65 years of age or older. The median household income was $39,570 and the median family income was $47,760. Males had a median income of $35,990 and females $28,429. The per capita income was $18,947. About 13.5% of families and 17.5% of the population were below the poverty line, including 25.4% of those under age 18 and 10.3% of those age 65 or over.

== Government ==
Middletown is governed by a mayor and a city council known as the common council. It consists of nine members: an alderman-at-large, who acts as president of the council, and eight members elected from wards. Each of the city's four wards elects two members. The mayor and the president of the common council are each elected at-large for four-year terms. The other council members have two-year terms. Terms of office begin on January 1.

A fire chief and three assistants are elected every three years by members of the city's engine companies. A corporation counsel, commissioners of public works and of assessment and taxation, a city clerk, registrar and a treasurer and any other officers required are appointed annually by the mayor and confirmed by the common council.

== Education ==
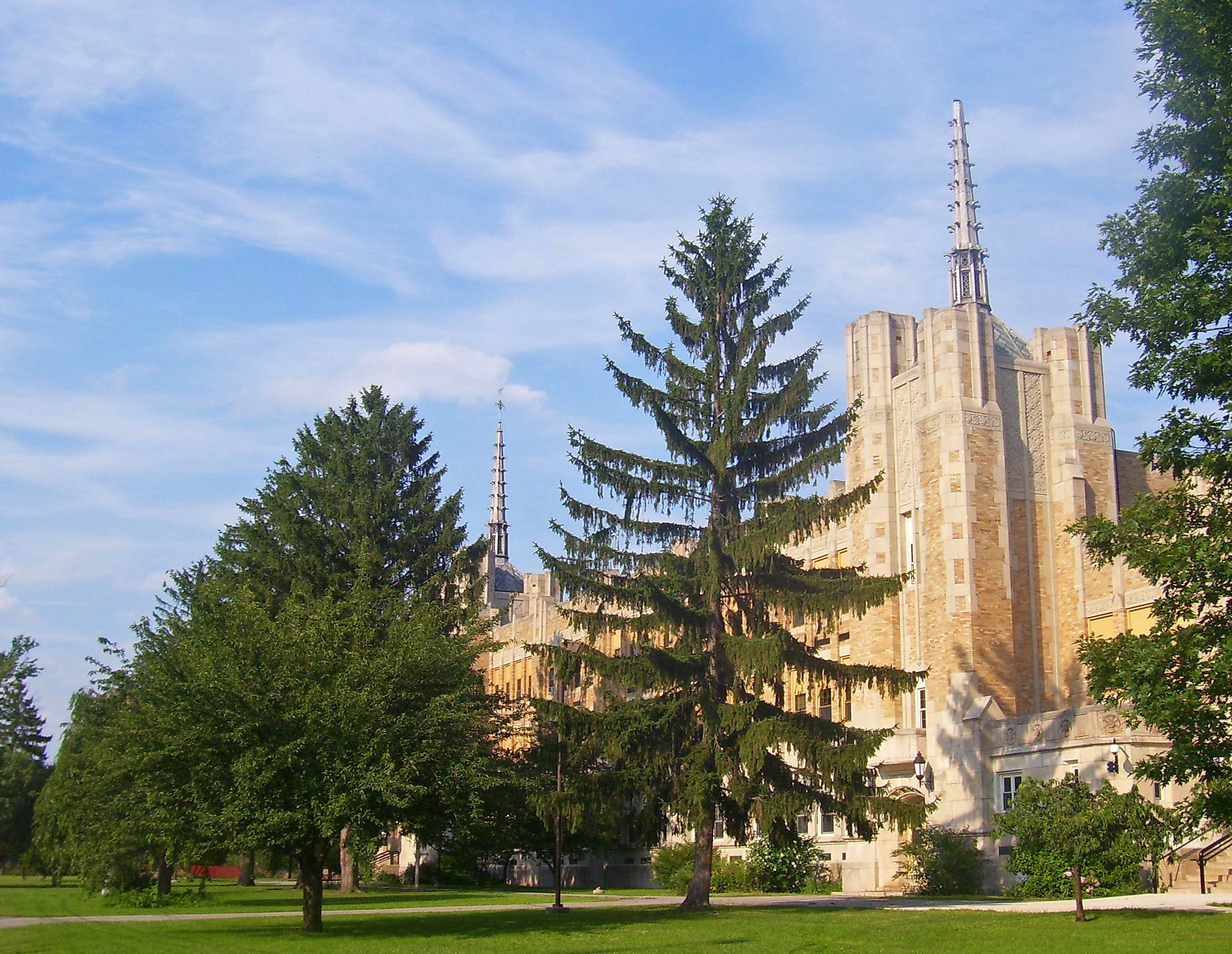
Twin Towers Middle School

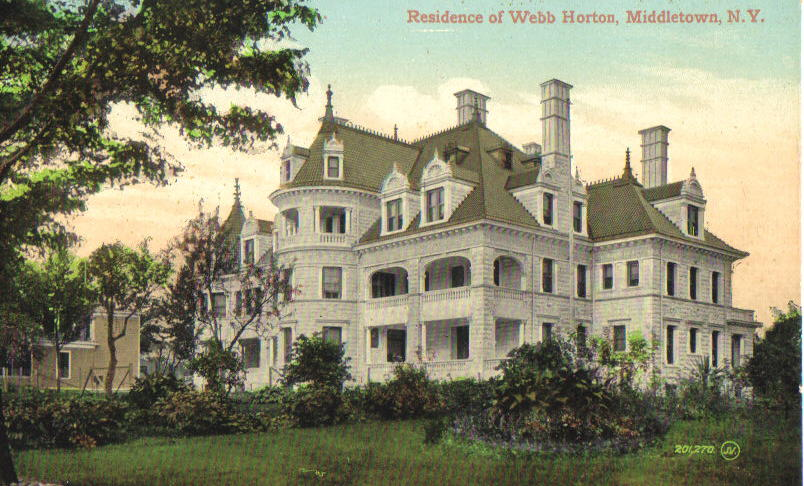
Morrison Hall (SUNY Orange, Middletown campus)

Middletown has three elementary schools covering grade levels from kindergarten to fifth grade. Both Truman Moon Elementary School and John W. Chorley Elementary School have made way for Presidential Park Elementary School, the district's newest school, built in 2014. William A. Carter Elementary and Maple Hill Elementary are the district's two other elementary schools. In 2005, the Middletown School District implemented a full day kindergarten program at the request of the Middletown voters. Two middle schools in the district, Twin Towers Middle School and Monhagen Middle School, collect the students from the elementary schools. Middletown High School is the only building for high school and includes grades nine to twelve. There is also a Catholic elementary school, Our Lady of Mt. Carmel.

SUNY Orange, previously known as Orange County Community College, is located in Middletown. Its campus includes the historic Webb Horton House (pictured), more commonly known as Morrison Hall. It also has a campus in Newburgh, and three satellite campuses, but the majority of buildings and students are in Middletown. More than 6100 students attend SUNY Orange. In addition to credit classes, there are a wide variety of classes for lifelong learning. Adelphi University offers a Hudson Valley Center located on the SUNY Orange campus.

Touro College of Osteopathic Medicine opened a Middletown Campus, in 2014, located in the former Horton Hospital.

== Surrounding area ==
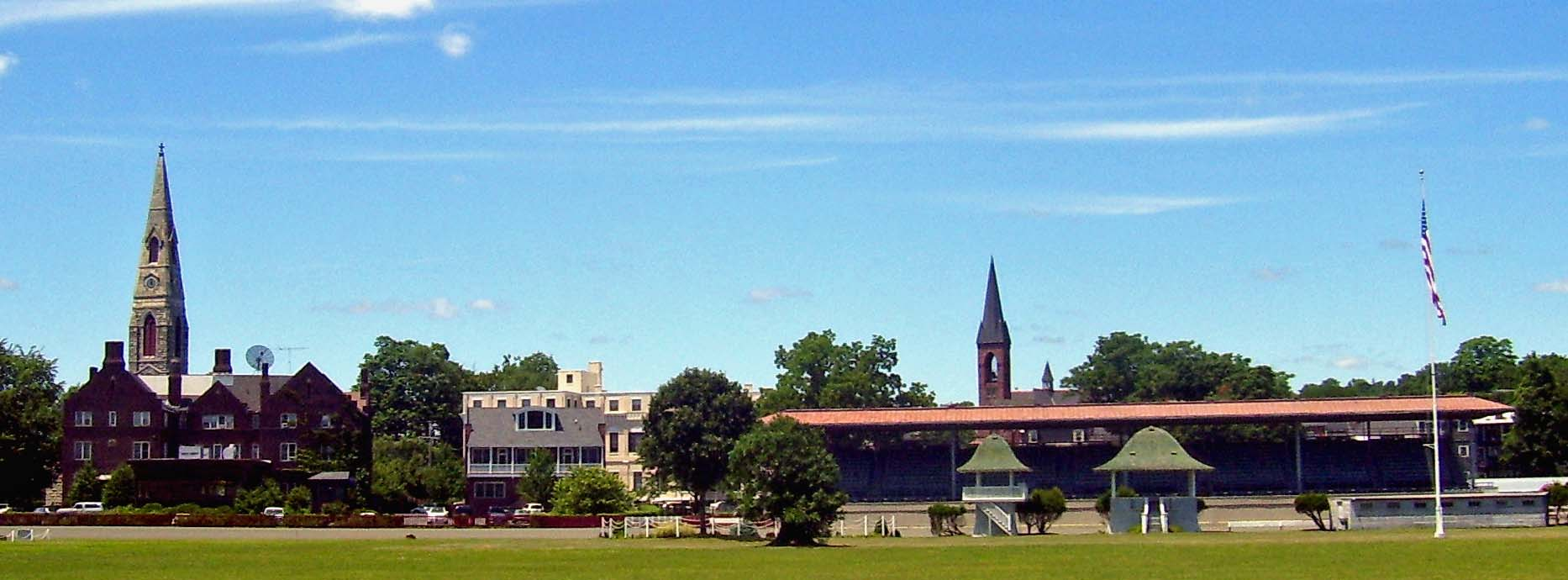
Nearby Goshen, viewed from its Historic Track, the oldest continuously operating harness racing track in the country

- Circleville
- Goshen, the county seat
- Monroe
- Newburgh
- Otisville
- Pine Bush
- Port Jervis
- Slate Hill
- Town of Crawford
- Town of Greenville
- Town of Hamptonburgh
- Town of Mamakating
- Town of Montgomery
- Town of Mount Hope
- Town of Wawayanda
- Town of Wallkill

=== Communities and locations adjacent to Middletown ===
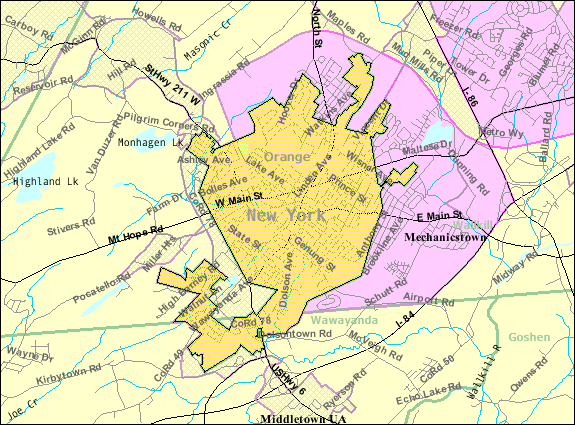
U.S. Census map

The following communities and places are all located adjacent to, or within a few miles of Middletown:

- Crystal Run – A hamlet east of Middletown, near Interstate 84 at County Road 83.
- Fair Oaks – A hamlet north of Middletown on NY Route 17M.
- Howells – A hamlet northwest of Middletown.
- Mechanicstown – A hamlet bordering Middletown to its southeast.
- Michigan Corners – A hamlet east of Middletown on Route 211.
- Phillipsburg – A hamlet southeast of Middletown on the Wallkill River and Route 17M.
- Pilgrim Corners – A hamlet bordering Middletown to its west on Route 211.
- Rockville – A hamlet north of Middletown.
- Scotchtown – A hamlet northeast of Middletown, just across Route 17 on Route 101.
- Van Burenville – A village to the north of Middletown near Mount Hope.
- Town of Wallkill – The township that nearly surrounds Middletown, most of which is located to the north and east of Middletown.
- Washington Heights – A hamlet bordering Middletown to its north.

== Media ==
The Times Herald-Record, a daily newspaper, is the result of a merger of several newspapers. Its antecedent newspapers date back to the 1850s.

WALL radio (Classic hits format), 1340 AM, has been on-the-air since 1942. WOSR, 91.7 FM, is a repeater of the NPR affiliate WAMC.

== Notable people ==
- Mike Avilés, shortstop for the Miami Marlins
- George M. Beakes, surgeon, physician
- Samuel Beakes, congressman
- Alan Berkman, physician, activist
- Bartley Campbell, playwright
- Little Sammy Davis, blues singer-songwriter
- Ed Diana, county executive, educator
- Rafael Díez de la Cortina y Olaeta, linguist
- Cleanthony Early, basketball player for the New York Knicks
- Christian Eckes, NASCAR Craftsman Truck Series driver
- Linda Fite, writer
- Benjamin A. Gilman, congressman
- Loren Grey, author
- Lydia Sayer Hasbrouck, women's dress reformer
- Angelo Ingrassia, New York Supreme Court judge
- Michael Jantze, writer
- Gerald Kersh, writer
- Cage Kennylz, rapper
- Edward M. Madden, New York State Senate
- Paul B. Malone, Army Major general
- Scooter McCrae, film director
- Howard Mills III, politician
- Matt Morris, baseball pitcher
- William Murray, congressman
- Joe Nathan, baseball pitcher, including with the Minnesota Twins
- Willi Ninja, dancer and choreographer
- Susan Beth Pfeffer, children's book author
- Mike Remlinger, baseball pitcher
- Joe Romm, author, energy and climate expert, editor
- Mally Roncal, makeup artist and entrepreneur
- Jerry Sands, baseball player
- Cordell Schachter, chief technology officer, U.S. Dept. of Transportation
- Bill Schindler, race car driver
- Kurt Seligmann, painter
- Frank Shorter, 1972 (Gold) and 1976 (Silver) Olympic marathon medalist
- Silas Stringham, admiral
- Dave Telgheder, baseball pitcher
- Launt Thompson, sculptor
- Spencer Tunick, artist
- Aaron Tveit, Broadway, TV and film actor and singer
- Jimmy Weinert, motocross national champion
