= New York's 98th State Assembly district =

American legislative district

Assemblymember
Karl A. Brabenec; R–Deerpark

New York's 98th State Assembly district is one of the 150 districts in the New York State Assembly. It has been represented by Republican Assemblyman Karl Brabenec since 2014.

== Geography ==
=== 2020s ===
District 98 consists of parts of Orange County and Rockland County. It consists of Port Jervis, and the towns of Deerpark, Johnson, Greenville, Mount Hope, Wawayanda, Minisink, Slate Hill, Warwick, Tuxedo and portions of Ramapo such as Suffern and Montebello.

The district overlaps (partially) with New York's 17th and 18th congressional districts, as well as the 38th and 42nd districts of the New York State Senate.

=== 2010s ===
District 98 consists of parts of Orange County and Rockland County. It consists of Port Jervis, and the towns of Palm Tree, Deerpark, Greenville, Minisink, Warwick, Monroe, Tuxedo, and portions of Ramapo.

== Recent election results ==
=== 2026 ===
2026 New York State Assembly election, District 98
Party	Candidate	Votes	%
Republican	Karl Brabenec		
Conservative	Karl Brabenec		
Total	Karl Brabenec (incumbent)		
Write-in			
Total votes			

=== 2024 ===
2024 New York State Assembly election, District 98
Party	Candidate	Votes	%
Republican	Karl Brabenec	37,028	
Conservative	Karl Brabenec	5,035	
Total	Karl Brabenec (incumbent)	42,063	99.0
Write-in		427	1.0
Total votes		42,490	100.0
Republican hold			

=== 2022 ===
2022 New York State Assembly election, District 98
Party	Candidate	Votes	%
Republican	Karl Brabenec	26,475	
Conservative	Karl Brabenec	3,703	
Total	Karl Brabenec (incumbent)	30,178	63.9
Democratic	Bruce Levine	17,013	36.0
Write-in		60	0.1
Total votes		47,251	100.0
Republican hold			

=== 2020 ===
2020 New York State Assembly election, District 98
Party	Candidate	Votes	%
Republican	Karl Brabenec	33,784	
Conservative	Karl Brabenec	5,274	
Independence	Karl Brabenec	2,444	
Total	Karl Brabenec (incumbent)	41,502	98.7
Write-in		541	0.0
Total votes		42,043	100.0
Republican hold			

=== 2018 ===
2018 New York State Assembly election, District 98
Party	Candidate	Votes	%
Republican	Karl Brabenec	18,199	
Independence	Karl Brabenec	4,240	
Conservative	Karl Brabenec	2,394	
Reform	Karl Brabenec	152	
Total	Karl Brabenec (incumbent)	24,985	62.7
Democratic	Scott Martens	13,139	
Working Families	Scott Martens	581	
Women's Equality	Scott Martens	314	
Total	Scott Martens	14,834	37.2
Write-in		25	0.1
Total votes		39,844	100.0
Republican hold			

=== 2016 ===
2016 New York State Assembly election, District 98
Primary election
Party	Candidate	Votes	%
Republican	Karl Brabenec (incumbent)	2,766	57.7
Republican	John Allegro	2,027	42.3
Write-in		0	0.0
Total votes		4,793	100
Democratic	Aron Wieder	2,325	58.8
Democratic	Krystal Serrano	1,632	41.2
Write-in		0	0.0
Total votes		3,957	100
Conservative	Aron Wieder	290	60.5
Conservative	Karl Brabenec (incumbent)	150	31.3
Conservative	John Allegro	38	8.0
Conservative	Krystal Serrano	1	0.2
Write-in		0	0.0
Total votes		479	100
Independence	Aron Wieder	378	80.4
Independence	Karl Brabenec (incumbent)	92	19.6
Write-in		0	0.0
Total votes		470	100
Green	Aron Wieder	35	61.4
Green	Krystal Serrano	15	26.3
Green	John Allegro	6	10.5
Green	Pramilla Malick	1	1.8
Write-in		0	0.0
Total votes		57	100
Reform	Aron Wieder	9	69.2
Reform	Karl Brabenec (incumbent)	4	30.8
Write-in		0	0.0
Total votes		13	100
Women's Equality	Aron Wieder	4	100
Women's Equality	Krystal Serrano	0	0
Write-in		0	0.0
Total votes		4	100
General election
Republican	Karl Brabenec	28,058	
Tax Cuts Now	Karl Brabenec	1,047	
Total	Karl Brabenec (incumbent)	29,105	58.9
Democratic	Aron Wieder	12,724	
Independence	Aron Wieder	4,785	
Conservative	Aron Wieder	1,775	
Green	Aron Wieder	292	
Women's Equality	Aron Wieder	206	
Reform	Aron Wieder	101	
Total	Aron Wieder	19,883	40.3
Write-in		379	0.8
Total votes		49,367	100.0
Republican hold			

=== 2014 ===
2014 New York State Assembly election, District 98
Primary election
Party	Candidate	Votes	%
Republican	Karl Brabenec	1,828	44.2
Republican	Daniel Castricone	1,467	35.5
Republican	Michael Morgillo	657	15.9
Republican	Kevin Hudson	180	4.4
Write-in		0	0.0
Total votes		4,132	100
Democratic	Elisa Tutini	1,189	35.6
Democratic	Aron Wieder	1,128	33.8
Democratic	Krystal Serrano	1,023	30.6
Write-in		0	0.0
Total votes		3,340	100
Conservative	Karl Brabenec	164	55.4
Conservative	Daniel Castricone	132	44.6
Write-in		0	0.0
Total votes		296	100
General election
Republican	Karl Brabenec	8,626	
Independence	Karl Brabenec	2,407	
Conservative	Karl Brabenec	1,910	
Total	Karl Brabenec	12,943	37.0
Democratic	Elisa Tutini	8,102	
Working Families	Elisa Tutini	4,804	
Total	Elisa Tutini	12,906	36.8
United Monroe	Daniel Castricone	9,118	26.0
Write-in		59	0.2
Total votes		35,026	100.0
Republican hold			

=== 2012 ===
2012 New York State Assembly election, District 98
Primary election
Party	Candidate	Votes	%
Democratic	Gerard McQuade Jr.	1,561	47.8
Democratic	Myrna Kemnitz	929	28.5
Democratic	Aron Wieder	772	23.7
Write-in		0	0.0
Total votes		3,262	100.0
Conservative	Ann Rabbitt (incumbent)	176	48.2
Conservative	Gerard McQuade Jr.	132	36.2
Conservative	Aron Wieder	55	15.1
Conservative	Myrna Kemnitz	2	0.5
Write-in		0	0.0
Total votes		365	100
General election
Republican	Ann Rabbitt	20,780	
Conservative	Ann Rabbitt	2,932	
Independence	Ann Rabbitt	1,312	
Total	Ann Rabbitt (incumbent)	25,024	55.5
Democratic	Gerard McQuade Jr.	18,959	
Working Families	Gerard McQuade Jr.	1,105	
Total	Gerard McQuade Jr.	20,064	44.5
Write-in		33	0.0
Total votes		45,121	100.0
Republican hold			
