= Howard Mills III =

American politician

38th Superintendent of Insurance of New York
- In office May 18, 2005 – December 31, 2006
- Preceded by: Gregory V. Serio
- Succeeded by: Louis W. Pietroluongo

Member of the New York State Assembly from the 97th district
- In office January 1, 2003 – December 31, 2004
- Preceded by: Joel Miller
- Succeeded by: Ann Rabbitt

Member of the New York State Assembly from the 95th district
- In office January 1, 1999 – December 31, 2002
- Preceded by: John Bonacic
- Succeeded by: Ryan Karben

Town of Wallkill Supervisor
- In office January 1, 1994 – December 31, 1998
- Preceded by: Bill Cummings
- Succeeded by: Tom Nosworthy

Personal details
- Born: May 29, 1964 (age 62) Goshen, New York, U.S.
- Party: Republican
- Spouse: Erin Rice-Mills
- Education: Marist College (B.A.); American University (M.P.A.)
- Profession: Insurance consultant

Howard D. Mills III (born May 29, 1964) is an American insurance consultant and former politician from Goshen, New York. He served as New York's Superintendent of Insurance from 2005 to 2006, and previously held elective office in both the New York State Assembly and the Town of Wallkill.

In 2004, he ran against Senator Charles Schumer of New York for the United States Senate but was defeated.

== Early life and education ==
Mills was born in Goshen, New York. The Mills family were prominent farmers in Orange County for 200 years, originally owning Mills Farm. Mills' father, Howard Mills, Jr., became a real estate developer who converted most of the farmland into residential and business developments. One large parcel of property owned by the Mills family was the original proposed site of the Woodstock Festival in 1969. The site was moved to adjacent Sullivan County when local residents objected to holding the festival in the Town of Wallkill.

Mills graduated from Pine Bush High School. He attended Marist College in Poughkeepsie, New York, graduating in 1986 with a degree in political science, and from American University in 1988 with a master's degree in public administration. While studying at American University, Mills was first a student intern and then a full-time staff member to Congressman Benjamin A. Gilman of New York, his own Congressman.

== Early career ==
Prior to beginning his political career, Mills served as Director of Development at Mount Saint Mary College in Newburgh, New York, where he also was an adjunct instructor of geography.

He worked as a business consultant to the telecommunications industry and was the business development and public relations officer for the Myles Financial Services Group in Florida, New York, while a member of the Wallkill Town Board.

Mills is a major in the New York Guard, a state militia organization. In the wake of the September 11 terrorist attacks, Mills was briefly called to active duty and later awarded the New York State Defense of Liberty Medal.

He is married to the former Erin Rice; they have two sons and one daughter.

== Early political career ==
At age 24, Mills won a seat on the Wallkill Town Board. and served two two-year terms, following which he was elected Town supervisor, a job he held from 1994 until 1998, when he was elected to the New York State Assembly. As Supervisor, Mills lowered taxes, improved the Town's bond rating, oversaw a landfill closure, three major bridge replacements and a town-wide road improvement program. Mills served for six years in the New York State Assembly after being elected in 1998. He served as the Deputy Minority Leader, sat on the Banking, Housing, Insurance and Ways and Means Committees, and was a member of the Armed Forces Legislative Caucus. He has been described as pro-choice (albeit opposed to "late term abortions"), "pro-Second Amendment", and a "moderate" on social issues.

In 2001, three years after Mills left his post as supervisor, state Attorney General Eliot Spitzer sued the town in federal court, accusing the police department of petty corruption, civil liberties violations, and harassment. The town entered into an agreement with the state, dismissed the police chief, agreed to the appointment of an overseer and accepted a lengthy code of conduct laid out by the state. The police chief, James Coscette, had been appointed by Mills and unanimously confirmed by the Town Board.

Did we collect specific evidence that this was going on when Howard Mills was supervisor? No, but we didn't need to go that far back. However, having done a lot of these investigations, the kinds of problems that we saw are not the kinds of problems that spring up overnight. They are the kinds of problems that fester for years and years, and so I would be very surprised if these problems had not been going on for many years, back through several administrations, including his.

— Mark Peters, Chief Investigator, New York State Attorney General's Office, January 19, 2001.

== 2004 campaign for U.S. Senate ==
In 2004 he dropped a bid for a fourth Assembly term in order to run against Charles Schumer for the U.S. Senate. He was considered a "sacrificial lamb" from the outset of the campaign. He was nominated by the State Republican Committee after its fallout with the conservative front-runner Michael Benjamin, who had a significant advantage to Mills in both fund raising and campaign volunteers. Mills was denied the nomination of the Conservative Party of New York State over the abortion issue. He faced considerable difficulty raising money and getting name recognition. He raised only $600,000 for the race, while Schumer's campaign amassed over $24 million. In the November election, as anticipated, Mills lost. His was the most lopsided contest for statewide office in New York State history, garnering 24% of the vote to Schumer's 71%. Marilyn O'Grady of the Conservative Party received 4%. Mills lost his own Assembly district, winning only Hamilton County, the least-populated and most Republican county in the state. Mills conceded the race minutes after polls closed and before any votes were counted.

== New York Superintendent of Insurance ==
In 2005, Mills was appointed by Governor George Pataki as the New York State Superintendent of Insurance, making him the state's top regulator of that industry. Mills signed landmark settlement agreements with the world's largest insurer as well as three prominent U.S. insurance brokers, secured auto rate premium reductions, was involved in securing an extension of the federal Terrorism Risk Insurance Act (TRIA) through the end of 2007, and within the Insurance Department itself, created a Corporate Practices Unit within the agency's Office of General Counsel.

After a New York Post article revealed that Mills had maintained his Assembly campaign account and continued raising funds while Insurance Superintendent, using them for purposes such as paying for a luxury car, dining out and purchasing gifts, Governor Pataki publicly chastised Mills' conduct. He served until 2007, when he reentered the private sector and became Chief Advisor, Insurance Industry Group, Deloitte & Touche USA.

Mills was seriously considering entering New York's 19th congressional district election, 2008, against freshman incumbent John Hall. Although Hall was targeted by National Republican Congressional Committee, they struggled to find a top tier candidate, and Mills' backers believed that he was up to the task. However, in late 2007, Mills issued a press release stating he was not interested in running for congress.

== Electoral history ==
U.S. Senate (class 3) from New York, 2004
Party	Candidate	Votes	%	±%
Democratic	Chuck Schumer (I)	4,769,824	70.6%	Democrat hold
Republican	Howard Mills III	1,625,069	24.6%	
Conservative	Marilyn F. O'Grady	220,960	3.4%	
Green	David McReynolds	36,942	0.5%	
Libertarian	Donald Silberger	19,072	0.3%	
Builders Party	Abe Hirschfeld	16,196	0.2%	
Socialist Workers	Martin Koppel	14,811	0.2%	

New York State Assembly
Preceded by John Bonacic	New York State Assembly, 95th District; 1999–2002	Succeeded by Ryan Karben
Preceded by Joel Miller	New York State Assembly, 97th District; 2003–2004	Succeeded by Ann Rabbitt
Party political offices
Preceded by Al D'Amato	Republican nominee for U.S. Senate (Class 3) from New York; 2004	Succeeded by Jay Townsend
Political offices
Preceded by Gregory V. Serio	Superintendent of Insurance of New York; 2005–2006	Succeeded by Louis W. Pietroluongo
