= Cait Conley =

American politician

- Conley in 2023

Member-elect of the U.S. House of Representatives from New York's 17th district
- Assuming office January 3, 2027
- Succeeding: Mike Lawler

Personal details
- Born: Caitlin Conley; 1985 or 1986 (age 40–41) Hudson Valley, New York, U.S.
- Party: Democratic
- Education: United States Military Academy (BS); Harvard University (MPP); Massachusetts Institute of Technology (MBA)

Military service
- Branch/service: United States Army
- Years of service: 2007–2023
- Rank: Major

Caitlin Conley (born 1985/1986) is an American politician and national security official who served 18 years in the U.S. Army. She is the Democratic member-elect for the U.S. House of Representatives in New York's 17th district after defeating incumbent Republican Mike Lawler in the 2026 election.

Conley served as an officer in the U.S. Army for 16 years with overseas deployments to Iraq and Afghanistan. Conley later led the Cybersecurity and Infrastructure Security Agency (CISA)'s election security efforts during the 2024 elections and was a director for counterterrorism on the National Security Council.

== Early life and education ==
Conley is a native of the Hudson Valley region of New York, splitting her time growing up between Pine Bush and Beacon. She graduated from Pine Bush High School in 2003. Her father was a construction worker and her mother was a postal worker. Her grandfather and great-grandfather both worked in a Montrose brickyard. She is a graduate of the United States Military Academy at West Point. She later earned a Master of Public Policy from the Harvard Kennedy School and a Master of Business Administration from the Massachusetts Institute of Technology.

== Military career ==
After graduating from West Point, Conley served as an officer in the U.S. Army for 16 years. She completed six overseas deployments, in Iraq and Afghanistan, and was one of the first women to lead a special ops team. Early in her career, she was a military police platoon leader in the 4th Brigade, 2nd Infantry Division, based at Fort Lewis in Washington. In January 2010, while Conley was deployed to Iraq with the platoon as a lieutenant, she was among the soldiers who met Vice President Joe Biden during his unannounced visit to Baghdad. She later spent more than a decade in the special operations community, serving as a team leader and a troop commander for regional and global counterterrorism task forces.

From 2021 to 2023, Conley served as a Director for Counterterrorism on the National Security Council. In 2023, the Russian Ministry of Foreign Affairs added Conley to a list of 500 Americans barred from entering the country, one of several entry bans imposed in response to what it described as the Biden administration's "anti-Russian sanctions". The New York Times attributed the ban to her counterterrorism work.

== National security career ==
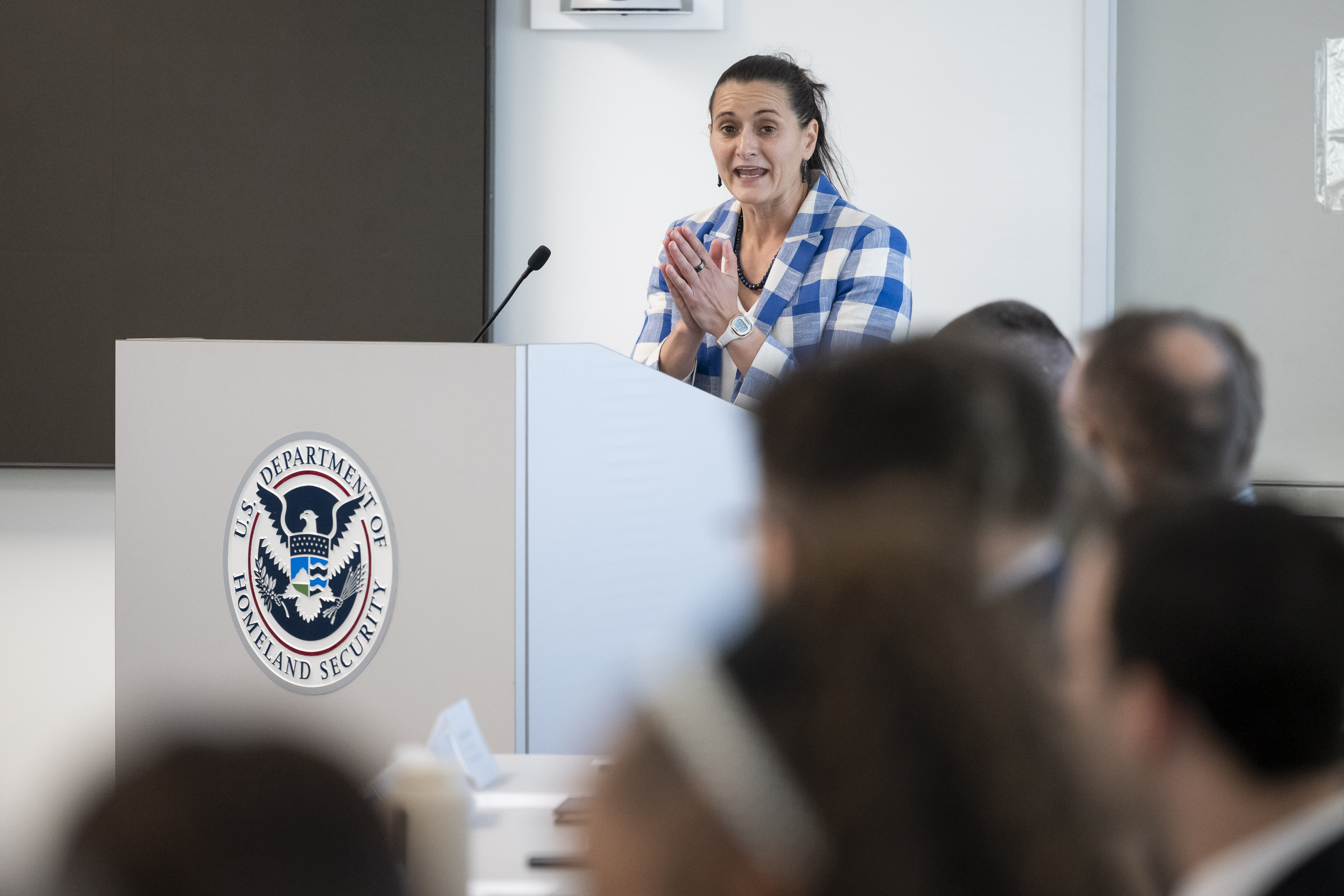
Cybersecurity and Infrastructure Security Agency (CISA) Senior Advisor, Cait Conley, introduces the Department of Homeland Security (DHS) Secretary, Alejandro Mayorkas (not shown).

After leaving active duty in 2023, Conley joined the Cybersecurity and Infrastructure Security Agency (CISA) as a senior advisor to director Jen Easterly. That year, she took over the agency's election security portfolio from Kim Wyman, becoming CISA's lead official for coordinating election security with state and local officials ahead of the 2024 election. In the run-up to the election, she was a frequent public voice for the agency, describing the election cycle as facing "the most complex threat landscape we've seen for an election cycle" while describing U.S. election infrastructure as more secure than in any previous cycle. On the morning of the election, Conley reported no evidence that malicious activity had materially affected the security or integrity of the election process. She left her position after the inauguration of Donald Trump in 2025. She worked as a consultant at anti-drone systems company Hidden Level and data company Primer AI for 19 months.

In 2023, Conley also joined the bipartisan Belfer Center for Science and International Affairs as the executive director of the Defending Digital Democracy Project, which worked to create strategies for election security.

== Political career ==
=== 2026 congressional campaign ===
On March 24, 2025, Conley announced her candidacy for New York's 17th congressional district. The district is one of three Republican-held seats nationally that Kamala Harris carried in the 2024 United States presidential election, leading Democrats to target it as a pick-up district.

Conley is a moderate Democrat. Conley's campaign has emphasized homeland security and public safety, protecting Medicaid and Medicare, and codifying abortion rights.

In June 2026, Conley won the Democratic primary with 49.6% percent of the vote, defeating four other candidates. Her campaign was endorsed by VoteVets and the New York Working Families Party.

In October 2026, during a debate with Mike Lawler, both candidates were asked by a moderator from PIX11 News if there should be a federal definition for consent. This was asked in the context of the Cornell rape allegations. Conley accused Lawler of failing to call out Representative Max Miller, an Ohio Republican, for the domestic violence allegations he is facing from Emily Moreno. Lawler responded to this accusation saying: "First of all, I did not blame Emily. I know both of them. It's very tragic, and it should be dealt with in family court," and then accused Conley of taking "money from Eliot Spitzer, who trafficked young women across state lines for the purpose of sexually abusing them, and you refuse to return those funds. You refuse to denounce him in any way." Referencing the fundraiser Spitzer held for Conley in 2025, which she received immense amounts of criticism for, Conley replied stating: "I do not need you to mansplain to me what domestic abuse and sexual assault against women is and the appropriate response. Don't start. Sit over there. I do not need you to mansplain to me, Mike."

In November 2026, Conley won the race after Lawler conceded.

== Personal life ==
Conley is an out lesbian.

== Election results ==
New York's 17th congressional district, Primary Election 2026
| Party | Candidate | Votes | % |
|---|---|---|---|
| Democratic | Cait Conley | 23,263 | 49.6 |
| Democratic | Beth Davidson | 14,938 | 31.8 |
| Democratic | Effie Guadalupe Phillips-Staley | 7,196 | 15.3 |
| Democratic | John Cappello | 758 | 1.6 |
| Democratic | Michael Sacks | 756 | 1.6 |
| Total votes | | 46,948 | 100.0 |

U.S. House of Representatives
| Preceded by Mike Lawler | Member of the U.S. House of Representatives from New York's 17th congressional district Taking office 2027 | Elect |
