= Karl A. Brabenec =

American politician

Karl Brabenec
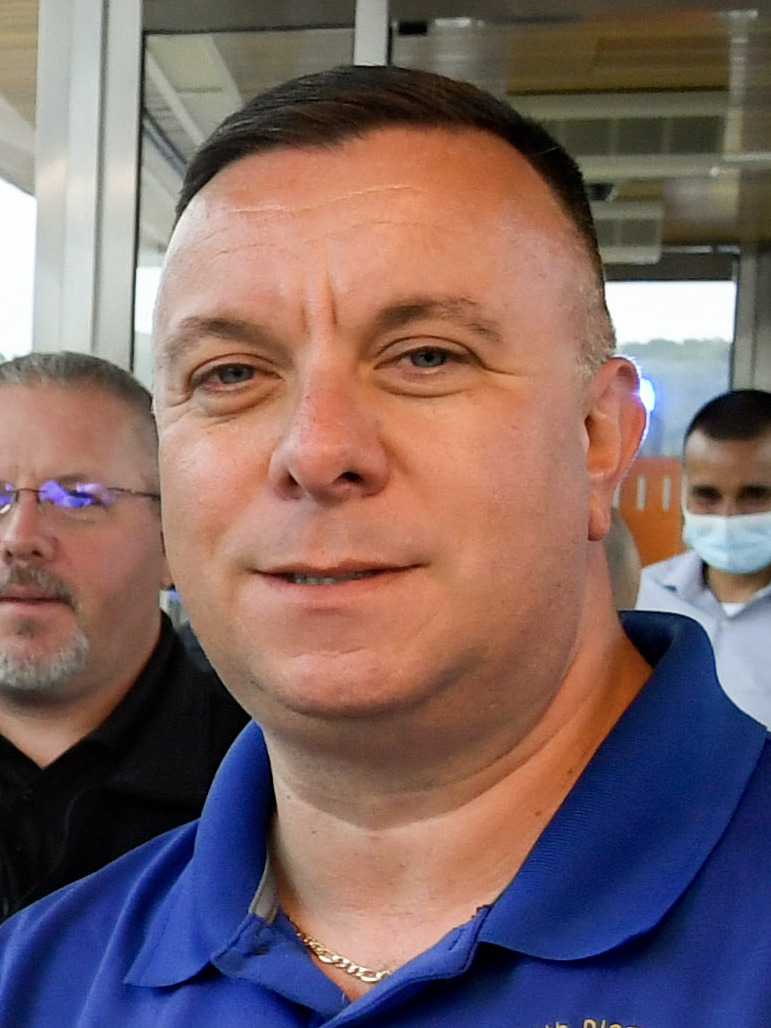
- Brabenec in 2021

Assistant Minority Leader - New York State Assembly
- Incumbent
- Assumed office February 13, 2026
- Preceded by: Phil Palmesano

Member of the New York State Assembly from the 98th district
- Incumbent
- Assumed office December 14, 2014
- Preceded by: Annie Rabbitt

Ranking Member of the New York State Assembly Committee on Standing Committees
- In office January 1, 2025 – February 13, 2026
- Preceded by: Joseph Giglio

Minority Whip of the New York State Assembly
- In office January 1, 2023 – December 31, 2024
- Preceded by: Nicole Malliotakis
- Succeeded by: David DiPietro

Town of Deerpark Supervisor
- In office January 1, 2010 – December 14, 2014

Town of Deerpark Councilman
- In office January 1, 2008 – December 31, 2009

Personal details
- Born: July 12, 1979 (age 47) Manhasset, New York, U.S.
- Party: Republican
- Spouse: Jessica Ebbecke (2005–2009)
- Children: Karl; Kimberlee
- Education: Mount Saint Mary College (B.A.); John Jay College of Criminal Justice (M.P.A.)
- Website: Campaign Website; Assembly Website

Karl A. Brabenec (born July 12, 1979) is the New York State Assemblyman from the 98th District. A Republican, he has served in the Assembly since 2014, when he won a special election. The 98th District contains portions of Orange and Rockland Counties in the Hudson Valley.

On February 13, 2026, Assembly Minority Leader Ed Ra announced Brabenec's promotion to Assistant Minority Leader, a top leadership role in the minority conference of the New York State Assembly. In this position, Brabenec oversees legislative procedures and manages minority operations.

Brabenec now holds the third-highest ranking position within the Assembly Minority Conference. He previously served as Ranking Member of the Committee on Standing Committees, and as Minority Whip.

== Personal life, education and career ==
Brabenec was born in Manhasset, New York and lived in Bayside, Queens before moving with his family to Slate Hill, New York when he was 8 years old. He went to Minisink Valley High School, and graduated from Mount Saint Mary College in 2000. In 2005, he received his Masters of Public Administration from John Jay College of Criminal Justice. His father, Rainer K. Brabenec, was a police officer with the New York City Police Department; Brabenec's mother, Emilie (Popule) Brabenec, was a police dispatcher, also with the NYPD. Both of Brabenec's parents are Czechoslovak refugees from the former Sudetenland who fled from Soviet communist oppression in the late 1940s.

At age 18, while attending Mount Saint Mary College, Brabenec was appointed as events coordinator for the City of Newburgh, New York. He was later appointed as executive director of the Downing Park Planning Committee.

Brabenec served as a staff assistant to Orange County Executive Edward A. Diana in the early 2000s.

In early 2007, Brabenec was appointed by the Deerpark Town Board to serve as a member of the Zoning Board of Appeals. Later that year in November, he was elected to serve as a Deerpark Town councilman.

In 2009, with the town facing fiscal difficulties brought on by previous administrations, Brabenec announced he would run for town supervisor and recruited a team of individuals with legal and business expertise to run for town board positions. All of those candidates, including Brabenec, were elected that November.

From 2010 to 2014, Brabenec served as town supervisor for the Town of Deerpark. He became an assistant professor at SUNY Orange in 2010.

Brabenec resides in Deerpark, New York, and has two children (Karl and Kimberlee) with his ex-wife, Jessica Ebbecke, to whom he was married from 2005 to 2009.

== New York State Assembly ==
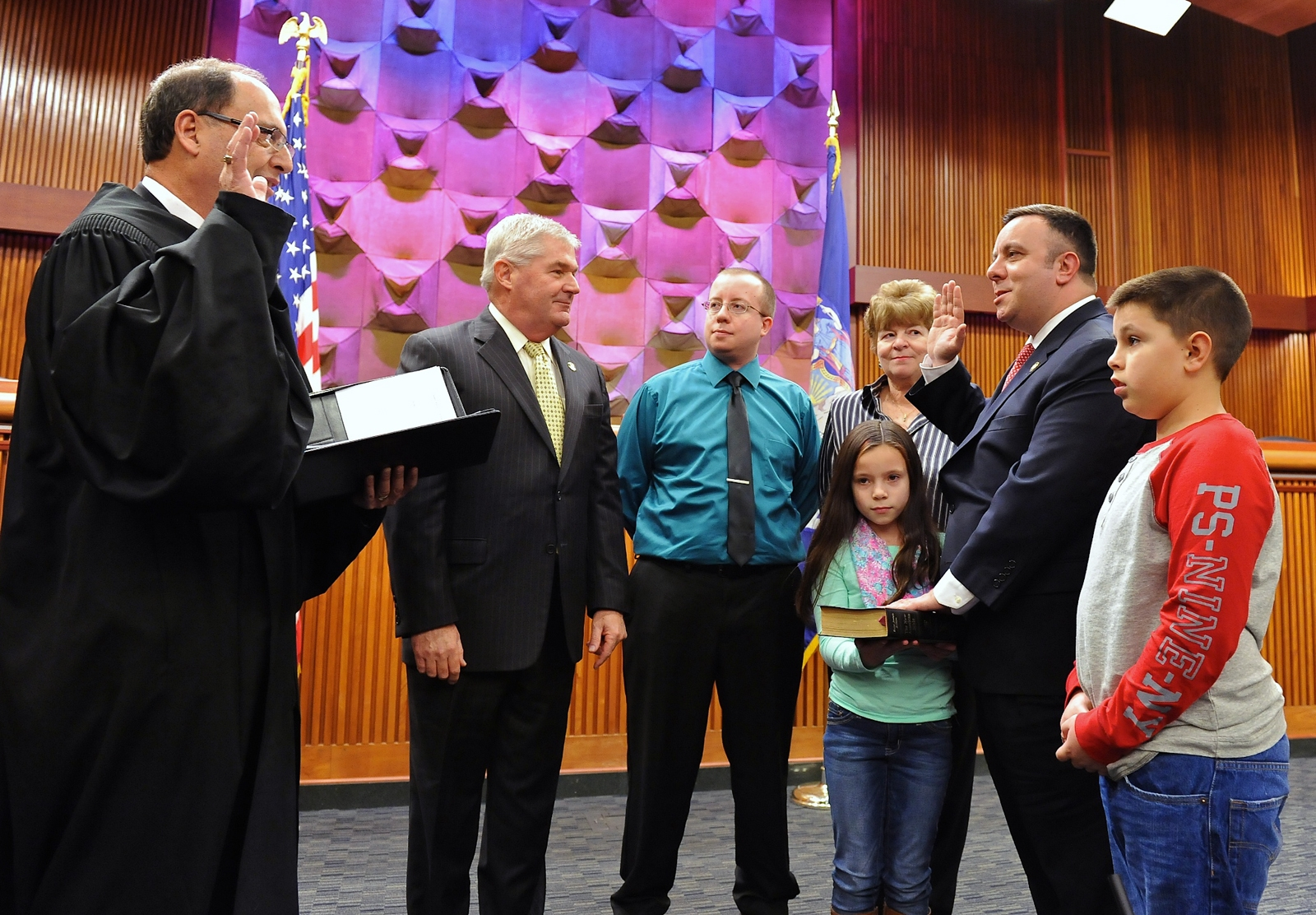
Brabenec takes the oath of office.

Brabenec was chosen in a special election held November 2014 to fill the remaining term of Assemblywoman Annie Rabbitt, who had resigned to become Orange County Clerk. Brabenec was concurrently elected to serve a full two-year term starting January 2015. He won re-election to a second term in 2016 with 59% of the vote, to a third term in 2018 with 63% of the vote, ran unopposed for a fourth term in 2020, to a fifth term in 2022 with 64% of the vote, and to a sixth term running unopposed in 2024.

Brabenec formerly served as the ranking minority member of the Labor Committee, and is currently a member of the committees on Rules, Labor, and Election Law.

On January 1, 2019, Brabenec was appointed assistant minority whip, a leadership position within the Assembly Republican Minority Conference, by then-Minority Leader Brian Kolb.

On January 1, 2021, Brabenec was appointed deputy minority whip, a leadership position within the Assembly Republican Minority Conference, by Minority Leader Will Barclay.

On January 1, 2023, Brabenec was appointed minority whip, a leadership position within the Assembly Republican Minority Conference, by Minority Leader Will Barclay.

On January 1, 2025, Brabenec was appointed Ranking member of the Committee on Standing Committees, a high-ranking leadership position within the Assembly Republican Minority Conference, by Minority Leader Will Barclay.

On February 13, 2026, Brabenec was appointed Assistant Minority Leader, a top leadership position within the Assembly Republican Minority Conference, by Minority Leader Ed Ra.

== Consideration to run for NY State Senate ==
On April 27, 2018, Brabenec confirmed he was considering running to replace retiring New York State Senator John Bonacic in the November 2018 election. The race was expected to be one of the most competitive in New York State and could easily determine whether Republicans maintained their slim majority in the New York State Senate. After careful consideration, Brabenec opted to continue his campaign for re-election to the 98th Assembly District for a third term and he won the general election on November 6, 2018.

== Community organizations ==
Brabenec's community involvement includes being a former member of the board of directors for the Regional Economic Community Action Program, Inc., an associate member of the Orange County Shields, member of the Greenwood Lake Benevolent and Protective Order of Elks Lodge #2067, Association of the United States Army, Town of Deerpark Lions Club, National Rifle Association of America, the Sons of the American Legion - Monroe Post #488, and the New York State Rifle and Pistol Association. He is also an honorary major with the United States Air Force Auxiliary Civil Air Patrol.

== Political involvement ==
Brabenec has been involved in the Republican Party since the age of 14.

He served as president of the Orange County (NY) Young Republicans from 1997 to 2003 and then again in 2005.

Additionally, he served as 1st vice chairman of the New York State Young Republicans and Northeast Regional (Region 1) vice chairman of the Young Republican National Federation (YRNF) from 1999 to 2001.

Brabenec served as vice chairman for the Town of Wawayanda and Town of Wallkill Republican Committees in the late 1990s and early 2000s.

Brabenec is currently chairman of the Town of Deerpark Republican Committee and 1st vice chairman of the Orange County (NY) Republican Committee.

== Awards ==
- 2010 Rising Star, Orange County Chamber of Commerce
- 2015 Rising Star, New York State Republican Committee

New York State Assembly
Preceded by Ann Rabbitt	New York State Assembly, 98th District; December 14, 2014 – Present	Incumbent
