= CVMS =

CVMS may refer to:

- Cardinal Vaughan Memorial School
- Canyon Vista Middle School
- Carmel Valley Middle School
- Cerro Villa Middle School
- Circleville Middle School
- Carson Valley Middle School
