= Joe Landolina =

American inventor and biomedical engineer

- Born: January 27, 1993 (age 33); Pine Bush, New York, U.S.
- Education: New York University Polytechnic School of Engineering
- Occupations: President & CEO of Cresilon, Inc.

Joseph Alexander Landolina (born January 27, 1993) is an American inventor and biomedical engineer, who is known for starting his company Cresilon, Inc. (formerly Suneris, Inc.) at a young age.

== Career ==
While an undergrad at NYU Poly, Landolina invented Vetigel, a substance intended for the treatment of wounds to skin, internal organs, and arteries. The gel can be used as a replacement for traditional gauze bandages. Landolina created the substance using the extracellular matrix matter from skin as a blueprint using plant-derived versions of polymers. In 2010, Landolina founded Suneris, Inc. with business partner Isaac Miller. Landolina is also a 2014 TED Fellow and received the Barry M. Goldwater Scholarship in 2013 for his work in the field of biomaterials.

== Personal life and education ==
Landolina is Italian-American, and was born in Pine Bush in Orange County, New York. As a child, he learned about chemistry from his grandfather at their family's winery, Baldwin Vineyards. He graduated from Pine Bush High School in 2010 before attending New York University Polytechnic School of Engineering. As of 2015, he has a bachelor's degree in Chemical and Biomolecular Engineering and a master's degree in Biomedical Engineering from New York University.
