= Alex Trezza =

American baseball player & coach (born 1980)

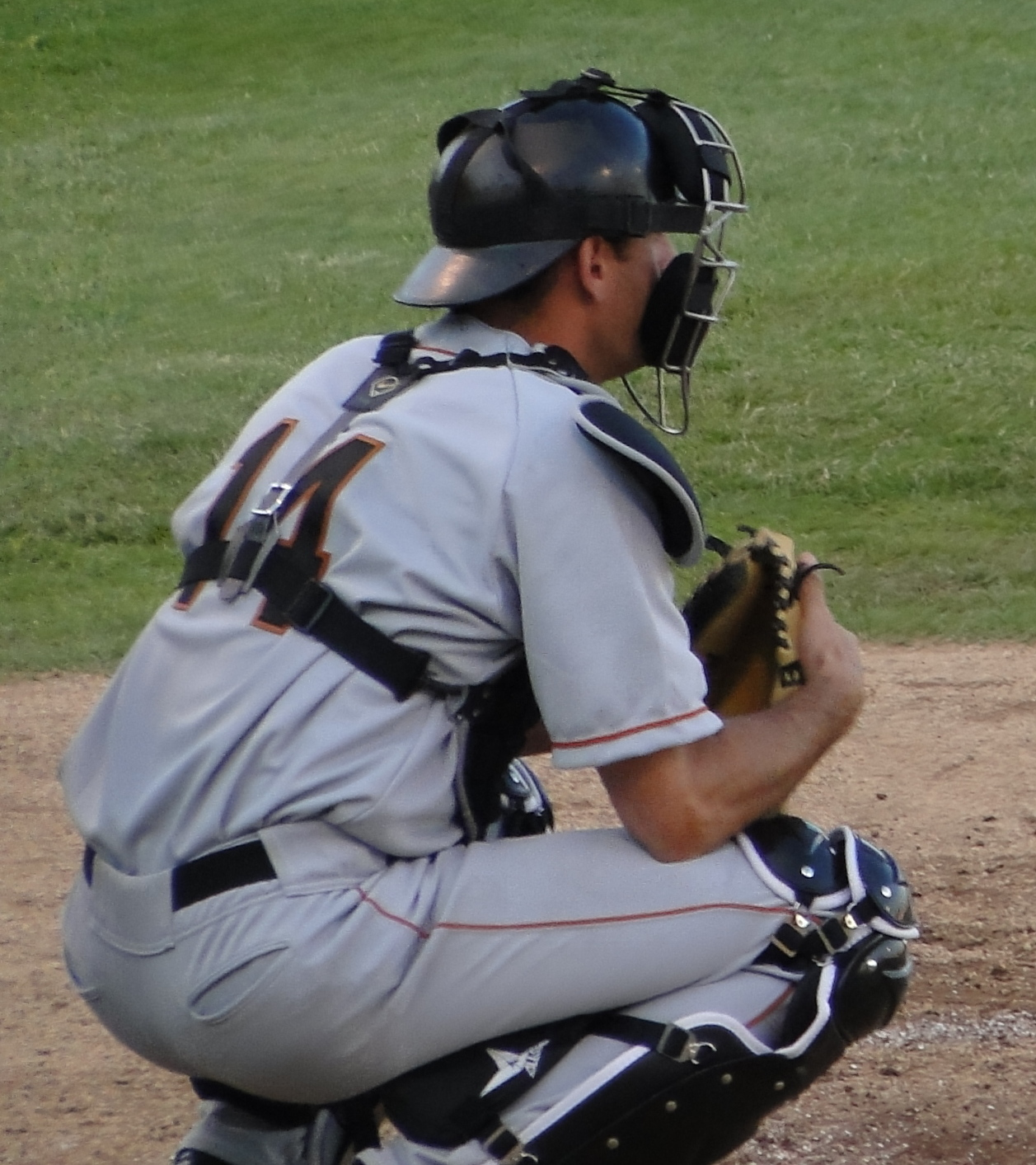
- Trezza with the Worcester Tornadoes in 2011

Biographical details
- Born: September 1, 1980 (age 46); Brooklyn, New York, U.S.

Playing career
- 1999–2001: Stony Brook
- Position: Catcher

Coaching career (HC unless noted)
- 2010: Anna Maria (assistant)
- 2011: Adelphi (assistant)
- 2012–2013: New Haven (assistant)
- 2014: Sacred Heart (assistant)
- 2015–2016: LIU Brooklyn
- 2017–2021: Boston College (P)

Head coaching record
- Overall: 35–70

Alex Trezza (born September 1, 1980) is an American college baseball coach and former catcher. He played college baseball at Stony Brook University. He served as head baseball coach of the LIU Brooklyn Blackbirds baseball team from 2015 to 2016.

== Career ==
Trezza graduated from Pine Bush High School in Pine Bush, New York in 1998 where he played varsity baseball and ice hockey for four years. As a hockey player, he represented the Hudson Valley in the Empire State Games.

Trezza played catcher at Stony Brook for three years, and in the 2001 season was among national leaders in offensive categories including home runs and RBI. Trezza also played club hockey at Stony Brook before giving it up to focus on baseball. He then played professionally for twelve seasons, reaching High–A in the Detroit Tigers organization.

Trezza began his coaching career at Anna Maria, where he served as an assistant for one season before moving to Adelphi for one season. Next, he served as assistant coach and recruiting coordinator at New Haven. He then earned his first NCAA Division I job at Sacred Heart, where he served for one season before earning his first head coaching position at LIU Brooklyn in 2015.

On July 19, 2016, Trezza left LIU Brooklyn to join the Boston College Eagles baseball team staff. Trezza left the Eagles after the 2021 season.

== Head coaching record ==
Record table
Season	Team	Overall	Conference	Standing	Postseason
LIU Brooklyn Blackbirds (Northeast Conference) (2015–2016)
2015	LIU Brooklyn	16–35	9–15	7th	
2016	LIU Brooklyn	19–35	13–17	5th	
LIU Brooklyn:		35–70	22–32		
Total:		35–70			
National champion Postseason invitational champion Conference regular season champion Conference regular season and conference tournament champion Division regular season champion Division regular season and conference tournament champion Conference tournament champion
