= New York's 97th State Assembly district =

American legislative district

Assemblymember
Aron Wieder; D–Spring Valley

New York's 97th State Assembly district is one of the 150 districts in the New York State Assembly. It has been represented by Democrat Aron Wieder since 2025, succeeding John McGowan.

== Geography ==
=== 2020s ===
District 97 is located in southern Rockland County, comprising all of the Town of Orangetown and a portion of the Town of Ramapo. It includes the village of New Square and portions of the village of Spring Valley, as well as the hamlet of Pearl River and a portion of the hamlet of Hillcrest.

The district is entirely within New York's 17th congressional district, as well as the 38th district of the New York State Senate.

=== 2010s ===
District 97 is located in southern Rockland County, comprising portions of Ramapo and Orangetown. It includes the towns of Suffern, Pearl River and portions of Spring Valley, Hillcrest, and New Square.

== Recent election results ==
=== 2026 ===
2026 New York State Assembly election, District 97
Primary election
Party	Candidate	Votes	%
Conservative	Abraham Klein	399	60.6
Conservative	Robert Bonomolo Jr.	260	39.4
Write-in		0	0.0
Total votes		659	100.0
General election
Democratic	Aron Wieder (incumbent)		
Republican	Robert Bonomolo Jr.		
Conservative	Abraham Klein		
Write-in			
Total votes			

=== 2024 ===
2024 New York State Assembly election, District 97
Primary election
Party	Candidate	Votes	%
Democratic	Aron Wieder	4,186	68.7
Democratic	Eudson Francois	1,868	30.6
Write-in		43	0.7
Total votes		6,097	100.0
Conservative	Thomas F. Sullivan	272	57.1
Conservative	John McGowan (incumbent)	194	40.7
Write-in		10	0.2
Total votes		476	100.0
General election
Democratic	Aron Wieder	24,749	51.9
Republican	John McGowan (incumbent)	21,098	44.2
Conservative	Thomas F. Sullivan	1,715	3.6
Write-in		118	0.3
Total votes		47,680	100.0
Democratic gain from Republican			

=== 2022 ===
2022 New York State Assembly election, District 97
Party	Candidate	Votes	%
Republican	John McGowan	19,635	
Conservative	John McGowan	4,624	
Total	John McGowan	24,259	66.9
Democratic	Eudson Francois	11,945	32.9
Write-in		62	0.2
Total votes		36,266	100.0
Republican hold			

=== 2020 ===
2020 New York State Assembly election, District 97
Party	Candidate	Votes	%
Republican	Mike Lawler	26,527	
Conservative	Mike Lawler	2,697	
SAM	Mike Lawler	397	
Independence	Mike Lawler	315	
Total	Mike Lawler	29,936	52.2
Democratic	Ellen Jaffee (incumbent)	27,359	47.7
Write-in		35	0.1
Total votes		57,330	100.0
Republican gain from Democratic			

=== 2018 ===
2018 New York State Assembly election, District 97
Primary election
Party	Candidate	Votes	%
Reform	Ellen Jaffee	422	98.8
Reform	Rosario Presti Jr.	3	1.2
Write-in		0	0.0
Total votes		427	100
General election
Democratic	Ellen Jaffee	22,855	
Reform	Ellen Jaffee	975	
Working Families	Ellen Jaffee	742	
Women's Equality	Ellen Jaffee	528	
Total	Ellen Jaffee (incumbent)	25,100	65.6
Republican	Rosario Presti Jr.	11,169	
Conservative	Rosario Presti Jr.	1,954	
Total	Rosario Presti Jr.	13,123	34.3
Write-in		12	0.0
Total votes		38,248	100.0
Democratic hold			

=== 2016 ===
2016 New York State Assembly election, District 97
Primary election
Party	Candidate	Votes	%
Democratic	Ellen Jaffee (incumbent)	6,200	65.4
Democratic	Thomas Gulla	3,279	34.6
Write-in		0	0.0
Total votes		9,479	100
Working Families	Thomas Gulla	41	62.1
Working Families	Ellen Jaffee (incumbent)	25	37.9
Write-in		0	0.0
Total votes		66	100
Green	Ellen Jaffee (incumbent)	11	91.6
Green	Thomas Gulla	1	8.3
Write-in		0	0.0
Total votes		12	100
General election
Democratic	Ellen Jaffee	27,509	
Green	Ellen Jaffee	2,273	
Total	Ellen Jaffee (incumbent)	29,782	61.2
Republican	Joseph Chabot	15,209	
Conservative	Joseph Chabot	1,941	
Reform	Joseph Chabot	520	
Total	Joseph Chabot	17,670	36.3
Working Families	Thomas Gulla	1,088	2.2
Write-in		63	0.1
Total votes		48,693	100.0
Democratic hold			

=== 2014 ===
2014 New York State Assembly election, District 97
Party	Candidate	Votes	%
Democratic	Ellen Jaffee	14,732	
Working Families	Ellen Jaffee	1,643	
Total	Ellen Jaffee (incumbent)	16,375	58.6
Republican	Robert Romanowski	9,591	
Conservative	Robert Romanowski	1,966	
Total	Robert Romanowski	11,557	41.3
Write-in		29	0.1
Total votes		27,961	100.0
Democratic hold			

=== 2012 ===
2012 New York State Assembly election, District 97
Party	Candidate	Votes	%
Democratic	Ellen Jaffee	27,920	
Working Families	Ellen Jaffee	1,626	
Total	Ellen Jaffee (incumbent)	29,546	65.1
Republican	Joseph Gravagna	9,591	
Conservative	Joseph Gravagna	1,966	
Independence	Joseph Gravagna	582	
Total	Joseph Gravagna	15,801	34.8
Write-in		32	0.1
Total votes		45,379	100.0
Democratic hold			
