= Aron Wieder =

American politician

Member of the New York State Assembly from the 97th district
- Incumbent
- Assumed office January 1, 2025
- Preceded by: John W. McGowan

Member of the Rockland County Legislature from the 13th District
- In office January 2, 2012 – February 13, 2025

Majority Leader of the Rockland County Legislature
- In office January 16, 2014 – December 17, 2015

Member of the East Ramapo School Board
- In office July 1, 2008 – June 30, 2011
- Preceded by: David Resnick
- Succeeded by: Daniel Schwartz

Personal details
- Born: Brooklyn, New York, U.S.
- Party: Democratic

Aron B. Wieder is an American politician serving in the New York State Assembly for the 97th district. A Democrat, he defeated incumbent John W. McGowan and flipped the seat in 2024. He has also served in the Rockland County Legislature for the 13th district since 2011.

== Political career ==
Wieder was elected to the board of East Ramapo Central School District in 2008, serving until 2011, becoming vice-president and then President during his tenure.

He was the Democratic candidate for New York's 98th State Assembly district in the 2016 general election, but was defeated. He ran in the 2014 Democratic primary for the 98th district, but lost by only 61 votes.

=== Rockland County Legislature ===
Wieder has served as a member of the Rockland County Legislature since 2011. He announced that he would remain in the position while concurrently serving in the State Assembly. On February 13, he announced that he would be resigning his seat in the Rockland County Legislature.

== Personal life ==
Wieder is a follower of the Belz dynasty of Hasidic Judaism, and a graduate of Brooklyn's Machzikei Hadas Yeshiva. He resides in Spring Valley.

New York State Assembly
Preceded by John W. McGowan	Member of the New York State Assembly from the 97th district 2025–present	Incumbent
