= Ryan Karben =

New York State politician

Ryan Scott Karben

Legislator; Rockland County Legislature
- In office 1997–2002
- Constituency: Ramapo, New York

Assemblyman; New York State Assembly
- In office 2003 – May 18, 2006
- Preceded by: Samuel Colman (Assembly seat from 1984-2002)
- Succeeded by: Ellen Jaffee
- Constituency: 95th Assembly District

Village Attorney - Spring Valley, New York
- In office 2010–2010
- Constituency: Spring Valley, New York

Personal details
- Born: September 29, 1974 (age 52) Bronx, NY
- Party: Democratic
- Spouse: Lauren C. Bekritsky
- Occupation: Lawyer

Ryan Scott Karben is an American attorney and former politician from the state of New York. A Democrat, Karben represented the state's 95th Assembly District from 2003 to 2006.

== Education and family ==
Karben was born in the borough of the Bronx on September 29, 1974. In 1979, his family moved to Spring Valley, New York. Karben was a student at the Frisch School in Paramus, New Jersey. He attended Yeshiva University as a Max Stern Distinguished Scholar and graduated magna cum laude in 1996 with a B.A. in English. He then attended the Columbia Law School as a Harlan Fiske Stone Scholar, graduating in 1999.

Karben married Lauren C. Bekritsky, his high school sweetheart, in June 1996. The Karbens have three daughters. Karben is an Orthodox Jew.

== Assembly career ==
In 1995, Karben lost his initial bid to become county legislator at the age of 21 when he finished fourth in a race for three open positions. In his concession speech at the Holiday Inn in Suffern, New York, Karben assured his supporters that he considered the election a positive experience and that he would be back.

In 1997, Karben was elected to represent Ramapo in the Rockland County Legislature. He was the youngest county lawmaker in the State of New York at that time. Karben was selected as majority leader of the Rockland County Legislature in 2001–2002.

In November 2002, Karben was elected to the New York State Assembly in Albany to represent the 95th district, which includes the Town of Orangetown and parts of the Town of Ramapo in Rockland County. Karben served on the Energy Committee and led an investigation of Consolidated Edison in 2004. Karben also pushed for tougher sex-offender tracking laws and environmental cleanups at several Rockland County sites.

Karben was involved in a fundraising controversy involving Charles Kushner, a New Jersey developer who served a prison sentence for hiring prostitutes in an attempt to influence potential witnesses in a New Jersey investigation. Kushner had contributed over $40,000 to Karben's campaign, and Karben contributed $2,500 to charity after revelations about Kushner surfaced.

=== Resignation ===
On May 18, 2006, Karben unexpectedly announced his resignation from the Assembly. Karben had reportedly been the subject of an internal investigation into alleged sexual advances toward staffers. According to The New York Times, sources stated that he had brought three staffers to his Albany residence and watched pornography with them; Karben allegedly stepped down to avoid facing a formal investigation. No formal complaints against Karben were ever filed. Karben's statement regarding his resignation made no reference to the alleged internal inquiry.

Subsequently, Karben left his position as a partner in the Spring Valley law firm of Kurtzman, Matera, Scuderi, Gurock, and Karben.

== Post-Assembly career ==
Following his resignation, Karben started his own law firm, the Law Office of Ryan Karben, based at his home in Monsey. In September 2007, Karben was named Managing Director of Fleishman-Hillard Government Relations, a national political consulting and lobbying firm. Karben also held the position of Village Attorney of Spring Valley, New York, but was fired by the village mayor in 2010 for dereliction of duty.

Preceded by Howard Mills III	New York State Assembly, 95th District; 2003–2006	Succeeded by Ellen Jaffee
