= Vetigel =

VETIGEL
- Inventor: Joe Landolina
- Inception: 2015
- Manufacturer: Cresilon, Inc.
- Website: https://vetigel.com

VETIGEL is a veterinary product, a plant-derived injectable gel that is claimed to quickly stop traumatic bleeding on external and internal wounds. Its name is coined from Medi-Gel, from the video game series Mass Effect. It uses a plant-based haemophilic polymer made from polysaccharides that forms a mesh which seals the wound. It is manufactured by Cresilon, Inc., an American biotechnology company, which is also exploring products for human use derived from its technology, which were expected to launch by 2016. The company plans to release a product for the military and the emergency medicine market first, followed by a product for the human surgical market when FDA approval is granted.

Cresilon, Inc. (formerly Suneris, Inc.) was founded in 2010 by Joe Landolina and Isaac Miller, while they were students at NYU Poly. Cresilon focuses on wound care products, specifically those in the field of hemostasis. The company operates out of a 25,000 sq. ft. manufacturing facility located in Sunset Park, Brooklyn, New York, United States.
