= John W. McGowan =

American attorney and politician

Member of the New York State Assembly from the 97th district
- In office January 1, 2023 – December 31, 2024
- Preceded by: Mike Lawler
- Succeeded by: Aron Wieder

Member of the Rockland County Legislature from the 15th District
- In office January 2, 2020 – December 31, 2022
- Preceded by: Patrick Moroney
- Succeeded by: Joel Friedman

Personal details
- Party: Republican
- Spouse: Christine McGowan
- Education: Saint Thomas Aquinas College; New York Law School
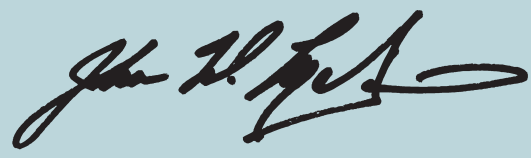
- Signature

John W. McGowan is an American attorney, politician and musician. A Republican, he represented the 97th District of the New York State Assembly, for the years 2023 and 2024.

== Career ==
After graduation from New York Law School, McGowan served as an Assistant District Attorney in The Bronx and a Senior Assistant District Attorney in his home county of Rockland. He was first elected to public office in 2019, as a member of the Rockland County Legislature from the 15th District. The 15th District included parts of Orangetown, Clarkstown, and Chestnut Ridge.

In late 2022, McGowan announced plans to run for District 97 of the New York State Assembly after incumbent Mike Lawler retired to run for federal congress. He won the election against Democratic challenger Eudson Francois and was sworn in on January 1, 2023.

In November 2024 he lost his reelection to longtime Democratic Rockland County legislator Aron Wieder by a margin of 7.5% points.

== Personal life ==
Currently, McGowan lives in Pearl River with his wife, Christine, and their two dogs.

New York State Assembly
Preceded by Mike Lawler	Member of the New York State Assembly from the 97th district 2023–2024	Succeeded by Aron Wieder
