= Mike Martucci =

American politician

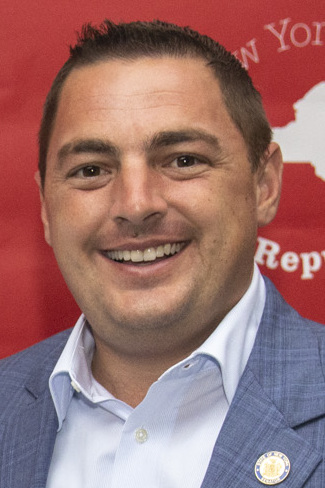
- Martucci in 2021

Member of the New York State Senate from the 42nd district
- In office January 1, 2021 – December 31, 2022
- Preceded by: Jen Metzger
- Succeeded by: James Skoufis

Personal details
- Born: June 2, 1985 (age 41)
- Party: Republican
- Spouse: Erin Martucci
- Children: Michael Jr, Elizabeth, Catherine
- Education: Marist College (BS, MBA)
- Website: Campaign website Official website

Mike Martucci is an American politician from the state of New York. A Republican, Martucci represented the 42nd district of the New York State Senate, based in the western Hudson Valley, from January 1, 2021 to December 31, 2022.

== Early career ==
At age 22, Martucci founded Quality Bus Service, a school bus business which provided service to the Greenwood Lake Union Free School District. In the 10 years Martucci owned Quality Bus, the company consistently earned over a 90% New York State Bus Net Safety Score, the safety score goal established by the Department of Transportation.

In November 2015, Martucci was voted President of the New York School Bus Contractors Association. As association president, he worked on several pieces of school bus safety legislation, including a law passed by Gov. Andrew Cuomo (D-NY) in May 2019, which allows school districts to cooperate with police in ticketing and enforcing Stop-Arm (bus-passing) driving violations. Accompanying this initiative, Martucci hosted two statewide "Operation Safe Stop" Events during his presidency, which brought awareness to the issue of passing stopped school buses outside of the legislative chambers.

At the time it was solid in April 2018, Quality Bus Service provided transportation for Port Jervis City School District, Marlboro Central School District, and Chester Union Free School District.

== State Senate ==
In 2020, Martucci announced he would run for the 42nd district of the New York State Senate against freshman Democrat Jen Metzger. After winning the Republican primary unopposed, Martucci narrowly defeated Metzger 50.5–49.5% in the general election. He took office in January 2021.

In 2022, Martucci led an effort to put forward an amendment that would end school mask mandates. The bill failed, with unanimous Republican support and unanimous Democratic dissent, a vote of 20–43.

In May 2022, Martucci announced he would not seek reelection.

On February 6, 2025, Martucci was appointed Regional Administrator for EPA Region 2.

== Personal life ==
Martucci lives in New Hampton with his wife, Erin, and their three children.

== Electoral history ==
2020 New York State Senate election in District 42
Party	Candidate	Votes	%
Republican	Mike Martucci	67,745	50.5
Democratic	Jen Metzger (incumbent)	66,376	49.5
Total votes		134,121	100.0
Republican gain from Democratic			

New York State Senate
Preceded by Jen Metzger	Member of the New York Senate from the 42nd district 2021–2022	Succeeded by James Skoufis
