= Johanna Contreras =

American public official

County Executive of Ulster County
- Acting
- In office September 9, 2022 – December 31, 2022
- Preceded by: Pat Ryan
- Succeeded by: Jen Metzger

Personal details
- Children: 2
- Education: University of Illinois Urbana-Champaign; The New School

Johanna Contreras is an American public official who was the acting executive of Ulster County, New York in 2022. She has served as a deputy executive and chief of staff to county executive Jen Metzger from 2023 to 2025. Contreras was previously a deputy executive under Pat Ryan from 2021 to 2022 and an assistant director for education in the New York City Mayor's Office of Management and Budget.

== Education ==
Contreras completed an undergraduate degree from the University of Illinois Urbana-Champaign. She earned a master's degree in urban policy analysis from the Milano School of Policy, Management, and Environment at The New School.

== Career ==
Contreras worked in several county governments in departments of health, social services, mental health, youth, human rights, aging, and veterans affairs. From 2013 to 2021, she worked for the New York City Mayor's Office of Management and Budget, most recently as the assistant director for education. In this role, Contreras oversaw the education task force which manages the budget of the New York City Department of Education, City University of New York, and the New York City School Construction Authority. In November 2021, Pat Ryan, the executive of Ulster County, New York named her his deputy. She was made the deputy county executive for health and human services in January 2022. Contreras succeeded Ryan as the acting county executive on September 9, 2022. She was succeeded by Jen Metzger on December 31, 2022. On November 18, 2023, Metzger named Contreras as the next chief of staff, succeeding Chris Kelly. On April 25, 2025, she left her deputy executive role to join the congressional office of Pat Ryan.

== Personal life ==
As of 2022, Contreras lives in Kingston, New York with her husband and two children.
