= Jen Metzger =

American politician (born 1965)

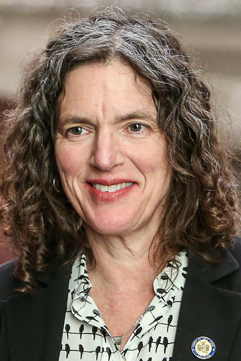
- Metzger in 2020

3rd County Executive of Ulster County
- Incumbent
- Assumed office January 1, 2023
- Preceded by: Johanna Contreras (acting)

Member of the New York State Senate from the 42nd district
- In office January 1, 2019 – December 31, 2020
- Preceded by: John Bonacic
- Succeeded by: Mike Martucci

Personal details
- Born: February 3, 1965 (age 61) New York City, New York, U.S.
- Party: Democratic
- Spouse: John Schwartz
- Education: Oberlin College (B.A.); Rutgers University (Ph.D.)
- Website: Official website Campaign website

Jennifer Metzger (born February 3, 1965) is an American politician serving as the county executive of Ulster County, New York since 2023. She is a member of the Democratic Party and previously represented the 42nd district in the New York State Senate from 2019 to 2020, and served on the Rosendale town council from 2013 to 2018.

== Background ==
Metzger was born and raised in New York City. She graduated from Oberlin College in 1987 and earned her Ph.D. in political science from Rutgers University in 2004. She is married with three children.

In 1988, Metzger began work as a public affairs coordinator with the United Nations, and later served as an instructor at the Walt Whitman Center for Culture and Politics of Democracy and Rutgers University.

In 2001, Metzger and her husband moved to Rosendale, New York, a hamlet in the Hudson Valley. She later chaired the Rosendale environmental commission and served as deputy town supervisor. In 2013, Metzger was elected to the Rosendale town council. She was reelected in 2017.

Metzger founded the nonprofit organization Citizens for Local Power, which organized dozens of town and city councils across the country.

== New York State Senate ==
In February 2018, Metzger announced that she would challenge longtime Republican Senator John Bonacic for his seat. Several months later, Bonacic announced that he would retire. In September, Metzger defeated Pramilla Malick in the Democratic primary. She faced Orange County Clerk Annie Rabbitt in the general election. Metzger defeated Rabbitt 52% to 48%.

Metzger was named Chair of the Senate Agriculture Committee. In 2019, she voted for the Green Light Law, which allowed undocumented immigrants to obtain driver licenses. She also voted for a law that ended cash bail in New York, but later proposed revisions to that law. She introduced a bill that, if passed, would codify New York's existing ban on hydraulic fracking, as well as a constitutional amendment to bar the inclusion of non-budgetary legislation in the New York state budget. She is a supporter of a single-payer health insurance system.

In 2020, Metzger lost her re-election bid to Republican Mike Martucci by approximately 1% of the vote. Metzger won 60% of the vote in Ulster County in the election for the 42nd Senate District.

== Ulster County Executive ==
In November 2022, Metzger defeated Republican Town of Ulster Supervisor James Quigley by 12% for the role of Ulster County Executive. Metzger became the first female elected to the leadership role, and the third woman to occupy the office. The race was held to fill the unexpired term of former Ulster County Executive Pat Ryan, who left office in September 2022 to become the U.S. representative for New York's 19th congressional district. Metzger went on to win a full term in November 2023, running unopposed.

New York State Senate
Preceded by John Bonacic	Member of the New York Senate from the 42nd district 2019–2020	Succeeded by Mike Martucci
