= List of Iona University alumni =

The following is a list of notable graduates of Iona University:

== Academics ==
- Abraham V. M, Vice-chancellor of Christ University, Bangalore.
- Regis J. Armstrong, professor at The Catholic University of America, expert on St. Francis of Assisi and Saint Clare of Assisi
- Vincent Boudreau, Thirteenth President of the City College of New York (2017 to present), Interim President of the City College of New York (2016)
- James J. McGovern, former president of A.T. Still University

== Arts & entertainment ==
- George Cain (1943–2010), author of Blueschild Baby
- Bud Cort, actor most famous for starring in Harold and Maude and MASH
- Kathleen P. Deignan, theologian and singer
- Tommy Dreamer (real name: Thomas Laughlin), former WWE professional wrestler and former ECW World Heavyweight Champion
- Terry Finn, actress
- John Gilchrist, former child actor known for playing 'Little Mikey' in Life cereal commercials
- Eileen Ivers, Irish-American musician
- Kyle Kulinski, political commentator and host of Secular Talk
- Tim McCarthy, VP of ESPN Radio
- Don McLean, American singer-songwriter most famous for the 1971 album American Pie, containing the songs "American Pie" and "Vincent"
- Antonio Broccoli Porto, Italian-Puerto Rican artist, visual artist and sculptor
- Mandy Rose (Amanda Rose Saccomanno), American professional wrestler signed to WWE, television personality, and former fitness and figure competitor
- Donald Spoto '63, American celebrity biographer
- Daniel Tobin, American poet and 2009 Guggenheim Fellow
- Terence Winch, Irish-American poet and songwriter

== Business ==
- Laurence Boschetto, president & CEO and President of Draftfcb
- Ron Bruder, American entrepreneur who runs Middle East education non-profits, named on the Time 100.
- Ellis E. Cousens, executive vice president, CFO & COO of John Wiley & Sons
- Randy Falco, President and CEO of Univision Communications Inc., former chairman and CEO of AOL LLC
- Robert Greifeld, chairman and former president/CEO of NASDAQ
- James P. Hynes, founder of COLT Telecom Group
- Alfred F. Kelly Jr., chairman and CEO of Visa, Inc.
- Catherine R. Kinney, former president & co-COO of the New York Stock Exchange (NYSE).
- Maggie Timoney, CEO of Heineken, USA
- John Zaccaro, real estate developer and owner of P. Zaccaro & Company; husband of Geraldine Ferraro

== Government ==
- Michael Benedetto, New York State Assembly member
- Ronald Blackwood, Mayor of Mount Vernon, New York (1985–1996), first elected black mayor in New York state
- John Bonacic, New York State Senator
- Timothy C. Idoni, Westchester County Clerk, former mayor of New Rochelle, New York
- Anthony T. Kane, former New York Supreme Court justice
- Edward R. Reilly '72, Maryland state senator
- Nicholas Spano, former New York state senator
- Kevin Sullivan, former White House Communications Director; honored with the NBA's "lifetime achievement award" for PR
- John Sweeney, president of the AFL–CIO

== Sports ==
- Mike Bertotti, former Major League Baseball pitcher with the Chicago White Sox
- Steve Burtt, Sr., former professional basketball player in the NBA; Steve and son, Steve Jr. are the all-time leading father-son scoring duo in NCAA history
- Tony DeMeo, college head football coach
- Eleri Earnshaw, current Wales international soccer player and soccer coach
- Kyle Flood, college head football coach
- Jerry Flora, college head football coach
- Sean Green, former professional basketball player in the NBA
- Richie Guerin, former professional basketball player and coach in the NBA
- Warren Isaac, former professional basketball player in Europe
- Tariq Kirksay, professional basketball player in Europe; member of French national basketball team
- Dennis Leonard, former professional baseball player with the Kansas City Royals
- Brendan Malone, current professional basketball coach in the NBA
- Scott Machado, former professional basketball player in the NBA. Currently plays professionally in Europe.
- Nakiea Miller, professional basketball player
- Jason Motte, professional baseball player with the St. Louis Cardinals, who was the closer in Game 7 of the 2011 World Series
- Jeff Ruland, former professional basketball player in the NBA; current college basketball coach; star on 1980 Gaels team that went to the NCAA tournament.
- Mindaugas Timinskas, former professional basketball player in Europe and member of the Lithuanian national basketball team
- Vito Valentinetti, former professional baseball player with the Chicago Cubs, Cleveland Indians, Chicago White Sox and Washington Senators

== Religion ==
- Gerald Thomas Walsh, auxiliary bishop and vicar general of the Roman Catholic Archdiocese of New York
