= Mike Lawler =

American politician (born 1986)

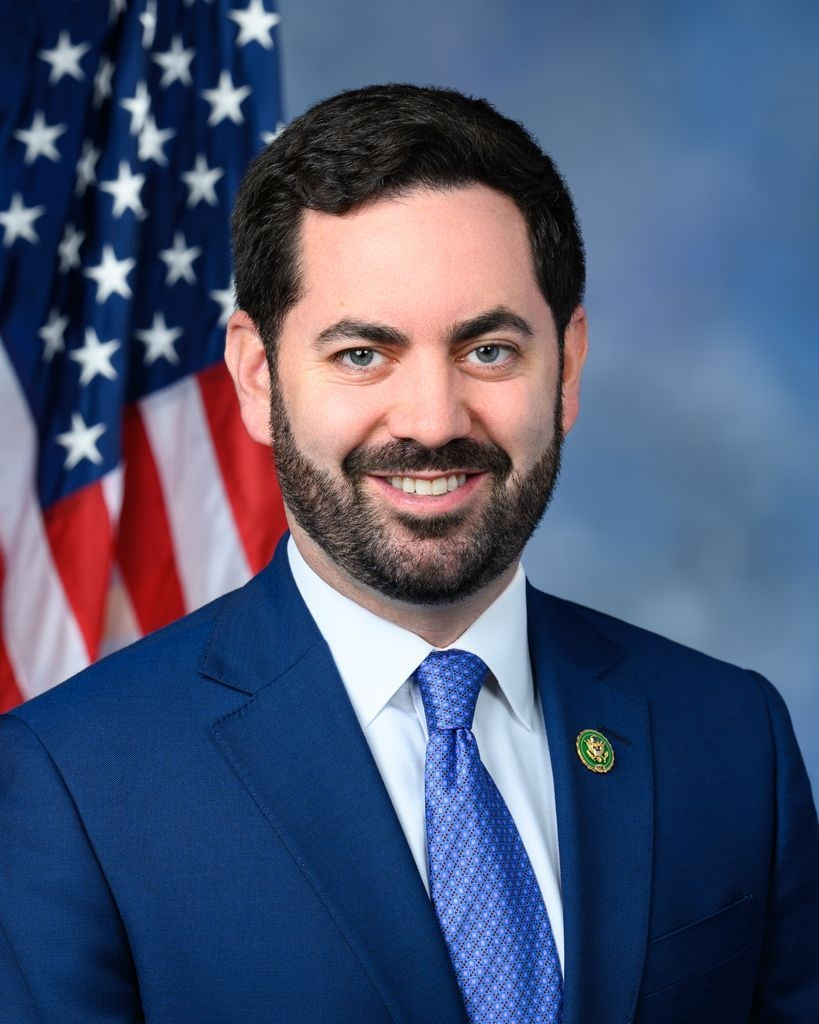
- Official portrait, 2023

Member of the U.S. House of Representatives from New York's 17th district
- Incumbent
- Assumed office January 3, 2023
- Preceded by: Mondaire Jones

Member of the New York State Assembly from the 97th district
- In office January 1, 2021 – December 31, 2022
- Preceded by: Ellen Jaffee
- Succeeded by: John W. McGowan

Personal details
- Born: Michael Vincent Lawler; September 9, 1986 (age 40) Suffern, New York, U.S.
- Party: Republican
- Spouse: Doina
- Children: 2
- Relatives: Traugott Lawler (great-uncle)
- Education: Manhattan College (BS)
- Website: House website Campaign website
- Lawler's voice Lawler questions witnesses on the New York-New Jersey Watershed Protection Act. Recorded July 27, 2023

Michael Vincent Lawler (born September 9, 1986) is an American politician who serves as the U.S. representative for New York's 17th congressional district since 2023. The district includes all of Rockland County and Putnam County, as well as most of Northern Westchester County, and portions of southern Dutchess County. Previously, he was a member of the New York State Assembly representing the 97th district from 2021 to 2022. He is a member of the Republican Party and ranked as one of the most bipartisan members of Congress.

Lawler was first elected to Congress in 2022, defeating Democratic Congressional Campaign Committee chair Sean Patrick Maloney. He was re-elected in 2024. He was one of three Republicans to win in a district also won by Kamala Harris that year. He lost his bid for re-election in 2026 to Cait Conley.

A moderate Republican, Lawler is a member of the Climate Solutions Caucus and the Republican Governance Group.

== Early life and education ==
Mike Lawler was born to Marie (née Fortino) and Kevin Lawler. He grew up in Suffern, New York. He is Catholic. He is of Irish and Italian descent. He graduated from Suffern High School in Suffern, New York. He earned his Bachelor of Science degree in accounting and finance from Manhattan College in the Bronx in 2009 and was named the valedictorian of his graduating class.

In October 2024, The New York Times discovered resurfaced photos of Lawler wearing a Michael Jackson costume which included blackface in 2006 at a Manhattan College Halloween party. In response, Lawler said that his costume was intended to be "truly the sincerest form of flattery, a genuine homage to my musical hero since I was a little kid trying to moonwalk through my mom's kitchen. The ugly practice of blackface was the furthest thing from my mind." It was also reported that in 2005, J. Randy Taraborrelli, a Michael Jackson biographer, helped get Lawler, then a high-school senior, into the courtroom for Jackson's trial.

== Early career ==
Lawler served as special assistant to the chairman of the New York Republican State Committee from 2009 to 2011. From 2011 to 2014, he was the committee's executive director.

On Saint Patrick's Day 2012, Lawler was arrested on suspicion of DUI. He disclosed the incident in the summer of 2026, while speaking to a group of high school students in his district about road safety and said the incident occurred after he had learned that his father was gravely ill while telling the students, "There is never a justification to drive impaired."

Lawler served as Rob Astorino's campaign manager in his unsuccessful 2014 run for governor, and thereafter as an assistant to Astorino as Westchester County Executive. In 2016, Lawler served as a Republican convention delegate for Donald Trump.

In 2018, Lawler co-founded the political communications firm Checkmate Strategies. From 2018 to 2020, he was the deputy town supervisor of Orangetown. In 2020, he was elected to the New York State Assembly for a two-year term, defeating Democratic incumbent Ellen Jaffee.

== U.S. House of Representatives ==
=== Elections ===
==== 2022 ====
Lawler was the Republican nominee in the 2022 general election in New York's 17th congressional district, having won the August 2022 primary. He narrowly defeated Democratic incumbent and DCCC chair Sean Patrick Maloney in the November general election.

==== 2024 ====
On November 5, 2024, Lawler was re-elected to the United States House of Representatives in the 17th congressional district of New York, besting his opponent, Democratic nominee Mondaire Jones, by 23,946 votes.

==== 2026 ====
The New York Times reported in September 2024 that Lawler was seen as a potential candidate for governor of New York in 2026. However, in July 2025, Lawler announced he would seek reelection to the House in 2026 instead of running for governor.

As of 12:40am on Wednesday Nov 4 (overnight after election day), Lawler had conceded loss in the NY-17 general election to his Democratic opponent, Cait Conley.

=== Tenure ===
Lawler with Mike Johnson in October 2023

On January 4, 2023, Lawler called then-newly sworn Representative George Santos's conduct "embarrassing and unbecoming" and "certainly a distraction". On January 12, Lawler called for Santos to resign. Lawler voted for Kevin McCarthy in the 2023 Speaker of the United States House of Representatives election. McCarthy was unable to win the speakership on the first 14 ballots. Lawler said of the matter, "It's time for everybody to unify. It's time for everybody to move forward because the reality is the American people didn't elect us to fight over rules."

After McCarthy's removal as speaker of the House, Lawler broke with his party by being one of 18 Republicans who voted against Jim Jordan's nomination for Speaker of the House all three times. He was one of five Republicans to vote against the Parents' Bill of Rights in March 2023. He co-sponsored the bill, but said he decided not to vote for it after an unspecified amendment "went too far". On June 21, 2023, Lawler voted to censure of Rep. Adam Schiff, despite previously having been one of 20 Republicans to oppose the measure. On July 6, 2023, Lawler introduced a bill to prohibit Washington, D.C. from adopting ranked-choice voting.

For much of 2023, Lawler had a policy of banning television news cameras from his town hall meetings; he rescinded the ban in early 2024. On October 5, 2023, he signed a letter to the House Agriculture Committee along with 15 House Republicans opposing the inclusion of the Ending Agricultural Trade Suppression (EATS) Act in the 2023 farm bill. The EATS Act, introduced in response to the California farm animal welfare law Proposition 12, would have overturned state and local animal welfare laws restricting the sale of agricultural goods from animals raised in battery cages, gestation crates, and veal crates. The letter argued that the legislation would undermine states' rights and cede control over U.S. agricultural policy to the Chinese-owned pork producer WH Group and its subsidiary Smithfield Foods.

Lawler is a supporter of raising the cap on the state and local tax deduction (SALT). His support for increasing the SALT deduction drew criticism from Marjorie Taylor Greene (R-GA) in May 2025. President Trump encouraged House Republicans to pass a spending bill that boosts the SALT cap to $30,000, up from the current $10,000 deduction. Lawler and other blue-state Republicans representing high-tax areas argued that this proposed increase was insufficient. Regarding Lawler's push for a higher SALT deduction, Trump singled out Lawler in a May 2025 meeting, saying, "End it, Mike, just end it." On July 3, 2025, Lawler voted for the One Big Beautiful Bill Act.

=== Caucus memberships ===
- Congressional Ukraine Caucus
- Climate Solutions Caucus
- Republican Main Street Partnership
- Republican Governance Group
- Moldova Caucus, co-chair

=== Committee assignments ===
- Committee on Financial Services
  - Subcommittee on Capital Markets
- Committee on Foreign Affairs

== Political positions ==
Lawler is a moderate Republican. In 2024, he was rated as being the fourth most bipartisan member of the U.S. House during the 118th United States Congress in the Bipartisan Index created by The Lugar Center and the McCourt School of Public Policy.

=== Abortion ===
Lawler opposes abortion except in cases of rape, incest, or if the mother's life is at risk, and opposes a federal ban on abortion.

=== Animal welfare ===
In August 2023, Lawler was a signatory in a letter to the House Agriculture Committee opposing the Ending Agricultural Trade Suppression (EATS) Act. The proposed act would have restricted state and local governments from imposing certain standards or conditions on the pre-harvest production of agricultural goods sold across state lines, and overturned various state and local laws related to animal welfare, including California's Proposition 12 and other rules restricting the sale of animal products raised in battery cages, gestation crates, and veal crates.

=== Congestion pricing ===
In 2023, Lawler opposed a plan by the Metropolitan Transportation Authority to enact congestion pricing in Manhattan, New York, one of the most traffic congested areas of the world. The change would result in a charge to most cars of $15 per day to drive in Manhattan below 60th Street. Lawler said that the congestion pricing plan was not intended to reduce congestion, but was instead an "outrageous cash grab". In 2024, he asked president-elect Donald Trump to kill the congestion pricing plan once he gets into office.

=== 2026 Iran war ===
In April 2026, regarding the Iran war, Lawler stated that "the question, moving forward, with respect to any troops on the ground, would be: For what purpose? And I think the only purpose that I could see would be to get the enriched uranium." That same month, Lawler said President Donald Trump's threat to destroy Iran's "whole civilization" unless Iran gave into his demands was a threat to target key Iranian infrastructure, and was not about "obliterating innocent people."

Lawler has opposed War Powers resolutions that would limit the Iran war until congressional consent had been obtained. He voted against one such resolution in June 2026.

=== Immigration ===
In April 2026, he was one of six Republicans who joined all Democrats in voting to grant Temporary Protected Status to approximately 350,000 Haitian immigrants, despite efforts by Donald Trump to terminate the program.

=== Israel-Palestine and antisemitism ===
During his 2022 campaign, Lawler said that traveling to Israel would be "one of my first endeavors" after taking office. He supported moving the US embassy from Tel Aviv to Jerusalem in 2018 and supports expanding the Abraham Accords.

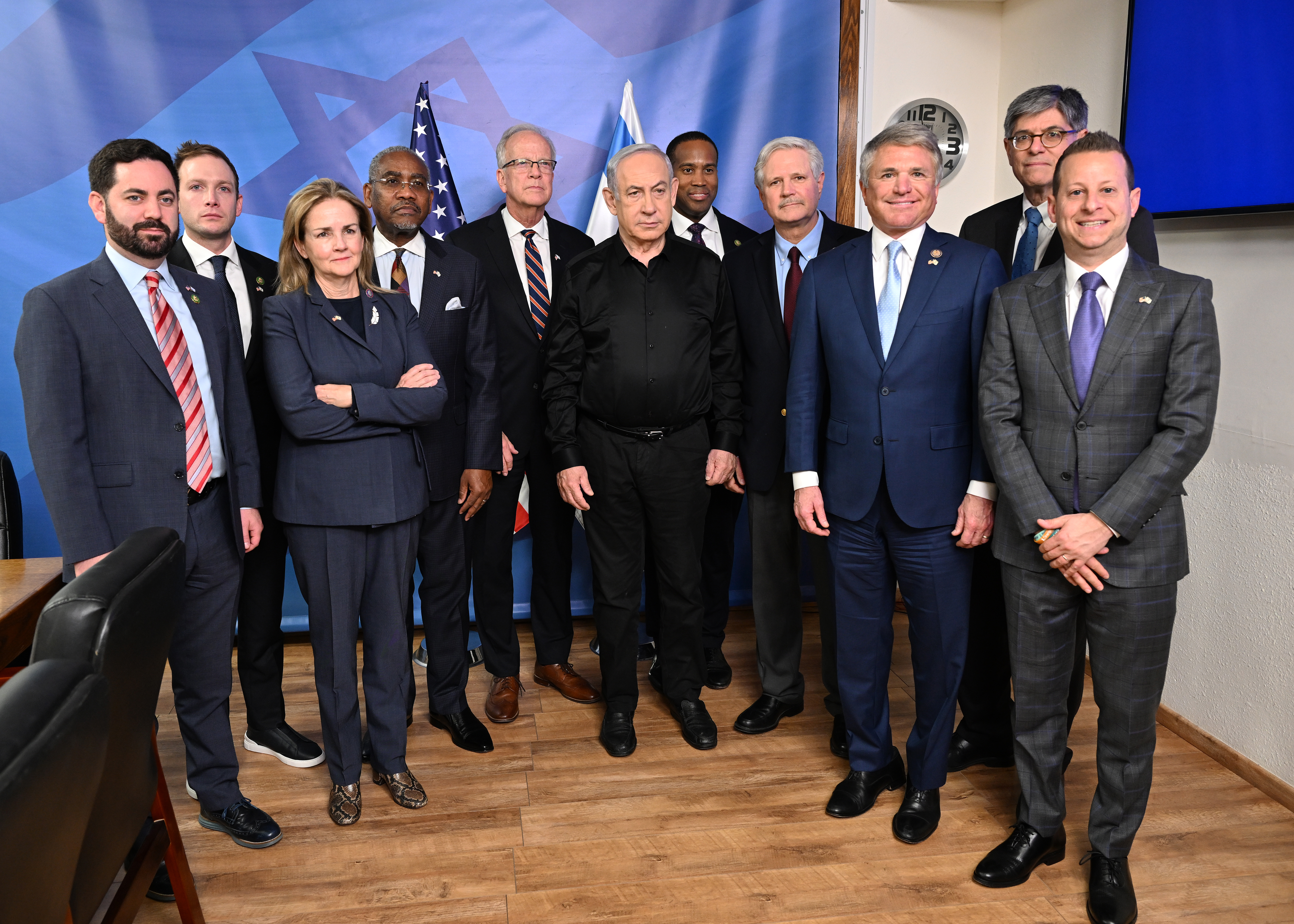
Lawler with Prime Minister Netanyahu in Israel, 2023

In May 2023, Lawler along with Democrat Josh Gottheimer introduced legislation expanding anti-boycott laws to include blocking boycotts organized by international governmental organizations (IGOs), with the intended effect of stopping the Boycott, Divestment, and Sanctions (BDS) movement in the United States. It would prohibit American citizens and companies from supporting boycotts organized by IGOs against U.S. allies, particularly Israel. The bill faced heavy criticism from House Republicans and conservatives who said it would violate Americans' First Amendment rights. House Republican leadership scrapped a vote on the bill in May 2025. Lawler co-sponsored a bill to ban the social media platform TikTok, alleging that it had a pro-Palestinian bias.

In May 2026, Kentucky Senator Rand Paul's son, William Paul, made antisemitic and homophobic insults toward Lawler at a Washington, D.C., bar. William Paul later apologized.

=== LGBT rights ===
Lawler supports same-sex marriage. He stated that he would have voted for the Respect for Marriage Act in 2022 if he were in office during the 117th Congress. In early 2026, Lawler vowed to seek further legislative action "If the court did decide to overturn" its prior ruling in Obergefell v. Hodges.

In March 2023, Lawler voted against the Parents' Bill of Rights in Education Act that he initially co-sponsored because an amendment was added that "unnecessarily targeted" transgender children and "went too far."

In early 2025, he voted for the Protection of Women and Girls in Sports Act of 2025 that would have banned transgender athletes from playing in women's sports, which was also supported by every single other House Republican in office at the time and two conservative Democrats from Texas; the bill failed to achieve cloture in the Senate due to a party-line filibuster.

In late 2025, Lawler was one of four House Republicans to vote against a proposal to criminalize gender-affirming care for minors nationwide, even as three conservative Democrats from multiple Southern states voted for the proposal. His reason for voting against was "I voted no because this bill is unconstitutional and a clear overreach of federal authority. Criminalizing parents and doctors is a dangerous slippery slope that puts Washington in the middle of deeply personal medical decisions." He also voted for a bill to ban federal Medicaid funds from being used to cover gender-affirming care for minors.

=== 2024 presidential election ===
Lawler voted for Trump in the 2024 Republican primary in New York. Lawler was one of six Republicans to sign a bipartisan letter pledging to respect the results of the 2024 presidential election.

== Personal life ==
Lawler is married to Moldova-born Doina. The couple have two daughters and they reside in Pearl River, New York. Lawler is a practicing Catholic.

== Electoral history ==
New York State Assembly District 97, general election 2020
Party	Candidate	Votes	%	±%
Republican	Mike Lawler	26,527	46.27	+17.91
Conservative	Mike Lawler	2,697	4.70	
Independence	Mike Lawler	315	0.55	
SAM	Mike Lawler	397	0.69	
Total	Mike Lawler	29,936	52.22	
Democratic	Ellen Jaffee	27,359	47.72	−17.9
Total	Ellen Jaffee (incumbent)	27,359	47.72	
Write-in		35	0.06	
Total votes		57,330	100.0	
Republican gain from Democratic		Swing	+35.81	

New York's 17th congressional district, primary election 2022
Party	Candidate	Votes	%
Republican	Mike Lawler	11,603	75.8
Republican	William Faulkner	1,772	11.6
Republican	Charles Falciglia	1,310	8.6
Republican	Shoshana David	444	2.9
Republican	Jack Schrepel	176	1.1
Total votes		15,305	100.0

New York's 17th congressional district, general election 2022
Party	Candidate	Votes	%
Democratic	Sean Patrick Maloney	130,999	45.6
Working Families	Sean Patrick Maloney	8,083	2.8
Total	Sean Patrick Maloney (incumbent)	139,082	48.5
Republican	Mike Lawler	124,148	43.3
Conservative	Mike Lawler	17,573	6.1
Total	Mike Lawler	141,721	49.4
Write-in		5,885	2.0
Total votes		286,688	100.0
Republican gain from Democratic			

New York's 17th congressional district, general election 2024
Party	Candidate	Votes	%
Republican	Mike Lawler	180,924	47.7%
Conservative	Mike Lawler	16,921	4.5%
Total	Mike Lawler (incumbent)	197,845	52.2%
Democratic	Mondaire Jones	173,899	45.9%
Working Families	Anthony Frascone	7,530	2.0%
Total votes		379,274	100.0%
Republican hold			

U.S. House of Representatives
Preceded by Mondaire Jones	Member of the U.S. House of Representatives from New York's 17th congressional district 2023–present	Incumbent
U.S. order of precedence (ceremonial)
Preceded by Nick Langworthy	United States representatives by seniority 327th	Succeeded by Laurel Lee
