= New York's 42nd State Senate district =

American legislative district

Senator
James Skoufis; D–Cornwall
- Registration: 37.6% Democratic; 29.7% Republican; 24.7% No party preference
- Demographics: 70% White; 8% Black; 16% Hispanic; 2% Asian
- Population (2017): 295,194
- Registered voters: 193,682

New York's 42nd State Senate district is one of 63 districts in the New York State Senate. It has been represented by Democrat James Skoufis since 2023, following redistricting.

== Geography ==
District 42 covers nearly all of Orange County, including all of the southern and western portions of the county. From 2012 to 2020, district 42 covered much of the Catskills and western Hudson Valley, including all of Sullivan County and parts of Orange County, Ulster County, and Delaware County.

The district overlaps with New York's 18th and 19th congressional districts, and with the 98th, 99th, 100th, 101st, 103rd, and 122nd districts of the New York State Assembly.

== Recent election results ==
=== 2026 ===
2026 New York State Senate election, District 42
Primary election
Party	Candidate	Votes	%
Conservative	Joshua Blumenthal (write-in)	422	62.5
Conservative	Jennifer Figueroa	240	35.6
Write-in		13	1.9
Total votes		675	100.0
General election
Democratic	James Skoufis		
Working Families	James Skoufis		
Total	James Skoufis (incumbent)		
Republican	Jennifer Figueroa		
Conservative	Joshua Blumenthal		
Write-in			
Total votes			

=== 2024 ===
2024 New York State Senate election, District 42
Primary election
Party	Candidate	Votes	%
Conservative	Timothy Mitts	435	51.9
Conservative	Dorey Houle	398	47.5
Write-in		5	0.6
Total votes		838	100.0
General election
Democratic	James Skoufis	68,764	
Working Families	James Skoufis	4,656	
Total	James Skoufis (incumbent)	73,420	54.4
Republican	Dorey Houle	54,614	40.5
Conservative	Timothy Mitts	6,694	5.0
Write-in		77	0.1
Total votes		134,805	100.0
Democratic hold			

=== 2022 ===
2022 New York State Senate election, District 37
Party	Candidate	Votes	%
Democratic	James Skoufis	46,686	
Working Families	James Skoufis	3,042	
Total	James Skoufis (incumbent)	49,728	50.8
Republican	Dorey Houle	43,292	
Conservative	Dorey Houle	5,004	
Total	Dorey Houle	48,296	49.2
Write-in		35	0.0
Total votes		98,095	100.0
Democratic win (new boundaries)			

=== 2020 ===
2020 New York State Senate election, District 42
Party	Candidate	Votes	%
Republican	Mike Martucci	60,003	
Conservative	Mike Martucci	6,311	
Independence	Mike Martucci	1,445	
Total	Mike Martucci	67,759	50.5
Democratic	Jen Metzger	59,812	
Working Families	Jen Metzger	6,310	
SAM	Jen Metzger	272	
Total	Jen Metzger (incumbent)	66,394	49.5
Write-in		43	0.0
Total votes		134,196	100.0
Republican gain from Democratic			

=== 2018 ===
2018 New York State Senate election, District 42
Primary election
Party	Candidate	Votes	%
Democratic	Jen Metzger	10,797	61.7
Democratic	Pramilla Malick	6,707	38.3
Write-in		0	0.0
Total votes		17,504	100.0
Reform	Ann Rabbitt	597	92.4
Reform	Jen Metzger	34	5.3
Write-in		15	2.3
Total votes		646	100.0
General election
Democratic	Jen Metzger	48,556	
Working Families	Jen Metzger	2,730	
Women's Equality	Jen Metzger	1,006	
Total	Jen Metzger	52,292	51.8
Republican	Ann Rabbitt	41,468	
Conservative	Ann Rabbitt	5,362	
Independence	Ann Rabbitt	1,225	
Reform	Ann Rabbitt	337	
Total	Ann Rabbitt	48,572	48.1
Write-in		52	0.1
Total votes		100,916	100.0
Democratic gain from Republican			

=== 2016 ===
2016 New York State Senate election, District 42
Primary election
Party	Candidate	Votes	%
Democratic	Pramilla Malick	2,517	90.8
Democratic	John Bonacic (incumbent)	218	7.9
Write-in		38	1.3
Total votes		2,773	100.0
General election
Republican	John Bonacic	56,343	
Conservative	John Bonacic	7,782	
Independence	John Bonacic	3,955	
Reform	John Bonacic	422	
Total	John Bonacic (incumbent)	68,502	61.0
Democratic	Pramilla Malick	43,667	38.9
Write-in		71	0.1
Total votes		112,240	100.0
Republican hold			

=== 2014 ===
2014 New York State Senate election, District 42
Party	Candidate	Votes	%
Republican	John Bonacic	35,661	
Conservative	John Bonacic	7,163	
Independence	John Bonacic	6,963	
Total	John Bonacic (incumbent)	49,787	99.5
Write-in		257	0.5
Total votes		50,044	100.0
Republican hold			

=== 2012 ===
2012 New York State Senate election, District 42
Party	Candidate	Votes	%
Republican	John Bonacic	53,760	
Independence	John Bonacic	10,611	
Conservative	John Bonacic	8,507	
Total	John Bonacic (incumbent)	72,878	99.5
Write-in		364	0.5
Total votes		73,242	100.0
Republican hold			

=== Federal results in District 42 ===
Year	Office	Results
2020	President	Biden 49.7 – 48.7%
2016	President	Trump 50.4 – 45.2%
2012	President	Obama 53.8 – 44.5%
2012	Senate	Gillibrand 65.4 – 32.9%
