= 2004 United States Senate election in New York =

- November 2, 2004
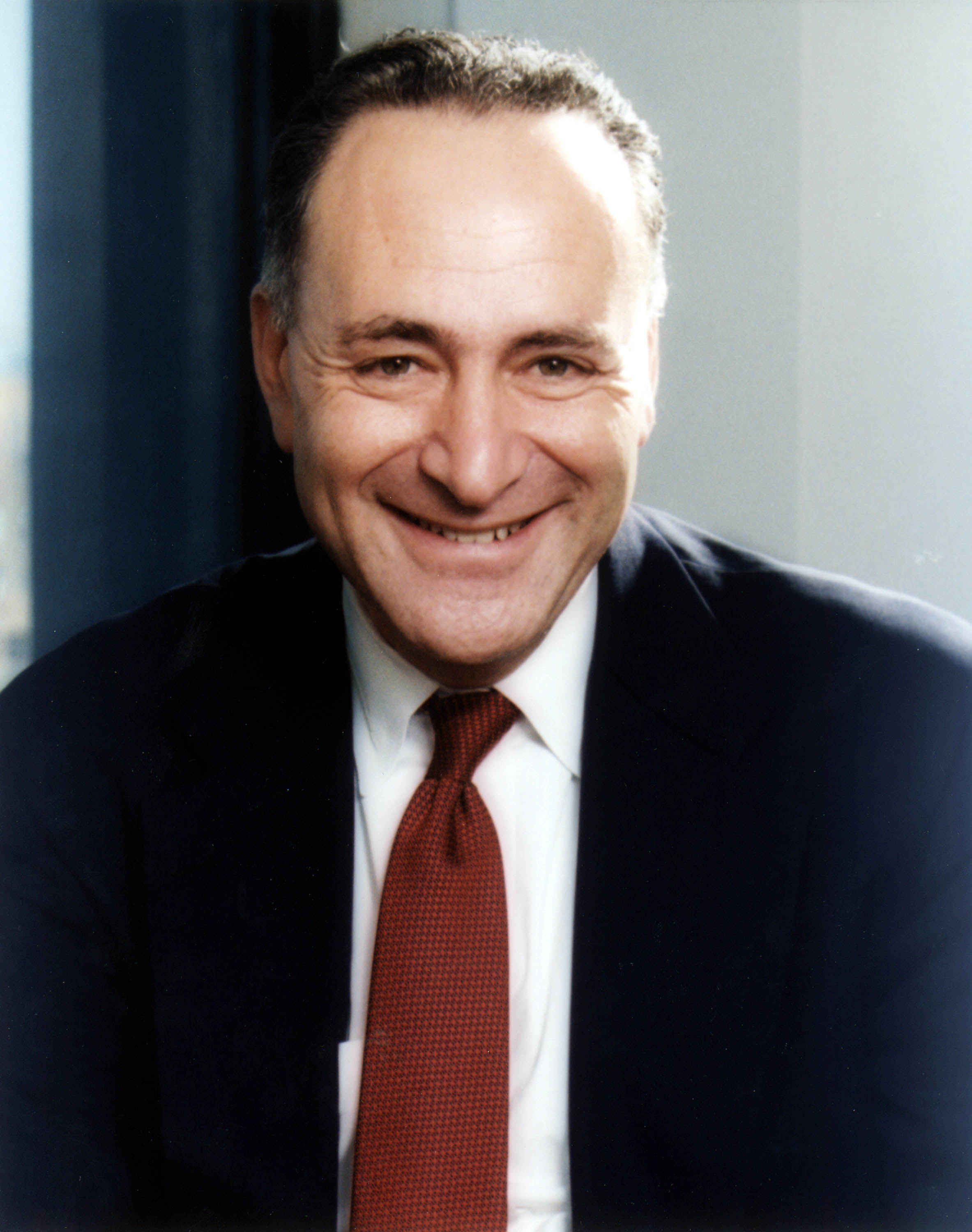

Nominee	Chuck Schumer	Howard Mills
Party	Democratic	Republican
Alliance	Parties: Independence; Working Families
Popular vote	4,769,824	1,625,069
Percentage	71.16%	24.24%
- County results Schumer: 40–50% 50–60% 60–70% 70–80% 80–90% >90% Mills: 50–60%
U.S. senator before election
Chuck Schumer
Democratic
Elected U.S. Senator
Chuck Schumer
Democratic

The 2004 United States Senate election in New York took place on November 2, 2004, along with elections to the United States Senate in other states, as well as the presidential election, elections to the United States House of Representatives, and various state and local elections. Incumbent Senator Chuck Schumer won re-election to a second term with 71.2% of the vote, at the time the highest margin of victory for any statewide candidate in New York's history, and winning every county except Hamilton.

Schumer's vote share would not be surpassed until 2012 when fellow Democrat Kirsten Gillibrand won her first full term with 72% of the vote.

== Candidates ==
=== Democratic ===
==== Declared ====
- Chuck Schumer, incumbent U.S. Senator

=== Republican ===
==== Declared ====
- Howard Mills III, State Assemblyman and former Town Supervisor of Wallkill

==== Declined ====
- Randy Daniels, New York Secretary of State
- Rudy Giuliani, former Mayor of New York City
- Peter T. King, U.S. Representative for NY-03
- George Pataki, Governor of New York

=== Conservative ===
==== Declared ====
- Marilyn O'Grady, Long Island ophthalmologist and activist

=== Green ===
==== Declined ====
- David McReynolds, socialist activist and two-time candidate for President with the Socialist Party USA

=== Libertarian ===
==== Declared ====
- Don Silberger, math professor at State University of New York at New Paltz

=== Builders ===
==== Declared ====
- Abraham Hirschfeld, real estate developer

=== Socialist Workers ===
==== Declared ====
- Martin Koppel, writer for The Militant and activist

== General election ==
=== Campaign ===
The Conservative Party of New York opposed Republican nominee Assemblyman Howard Mills, due to his support of civil unions and abortion rights. Instead, they supported ophthalmologist Marilyn O'Grady, a failed candidate for New York's 4th congressional district of the United States House of Representatives in 2002.

Perennial candidate Abraham Hirschfeld, then 84 years old, ran for the office on a minor party line. It was the last campaign of his life, and he would die less than a year later.

=== Predictions ===
Source	Ranking	As of
Sabato's Crystal Ball	Safe D	November 1, 2004

=== Results ===

Source: New York State Board of Elections General Election Results, Certified December 14, 2006

2004 United States Senate election, New York
Party	Candidate	Votes	%	±%
Democratic	Chuck Schumer	4,384,907	65.42%	+13.33
Independence	Chuck Schumer	216,198	3.23%	+0.90
Working Families	Chuck Schumer	168,719	2.52%	N/A
Total	Chuck Schumer (Incumbent)	4,769,824	71.16%	+16.54
Republican	Howard Mills	1,625,069	24.24%	−19.84
Conservative	Marilyn O'Grady	220,960	3.30%	−2.57
Green	David McReynolds	36,942	0.55%	+0.23
Libertarian	Don Silberger	19,073	0.28%	+0.10
Builders Party	Abe Hirschfeld	16,196	0.24%	N/A
Socialist Workers	Martin Koppel	14,811	0.22%	+0.14
Majority		3,144,755	46.92%	
Turnout		6,702,875		
Democratic hold		Swing		

==== Results by county ====
County	Chuck Schumer Democratic		Howard Mills Republican		All others		Margin		Total votes cast
County	#	%	#	%	#	%	#	%	Total votes cast
Albany	95,247	69.8%	34,800	25.5%	6,364	4.6%	60,447	44.3%	136,411
Allegany	8,399	48.7%	7,856	45.5%	999	5.8%	543	3.2%	17,254
Bronx	269,768	90.6%	21,935	7.4%	6,060	2.0%	247,833	83.2%	297,763
Broome	51,339	61.7%	27,768	33.4%	4,072	4.8%	23,571	28.3%	83,179
Cattaraugus	17,104	55.4%	12,194	39.5%	1,590	5.2%	4,910	15.9%	30,888
Cayuga	18,719	58.5%	11,107	34.7%	2,154	6.7%	7,612	23.8%	31,980
Chautauqua	34,116	61.9%	18,545	33.6%	6,971	4.5%	15,571	28.3%	55,132
Chemung	20,242	57.9%	13,165	37.6%	1,562	4.5%	7,077	20.3%	34,969
Chenango	9,880	51.4%	8,171	42.5%	1,184	6.2%	1,709	8.9%	19,235
Clinton	18,509	62.1%	9,873	33.1%	1,418	4.7%	8,636	29.0%	29,800
Columbia	16,926	59.7%	9,868	34.8%	1,560	5.5%	7,058	24.9%	28,354
Cortland	11,486	57.4%	7,366	36.8%	1,168	5.8%	4,120	20.6%	20,020
Delaware	9,600	50.1%	8,423	44.0%	1,121	5.9%	1,177	6.1%	19,144
Dutchess	66,100	59.4%	38,170	34.3%	6,997	6.3%	27,930	25.1%	111,267
Erie	290,210	72.0%	91,985	22.8%	20,912	5.2%	198,225	49.2%	403,107
Essex	8,726	52.8%	6,693	40.5%	1,106	6.7%	2,033	12.3%	16,525
Franklin	9,913	61.9%	5,443	34.0%	670	4.2%	4,470	27.9%	16,026
Fulton	10,207	52.7%	7,913	40.8%	1,259	6.5%	2,294	11.9%	19,379
Genesee	13,454	54.9%	9,584	39.1%	1,457	5.9%	3,870	15.8%	24,495
Greene	10,352	49.9%	9,150	44.1%	1,251	6.0%	1,202	5.8%	20,753
Hamilton	1,434	43.3%	1,697	51.3%	178	5.4%	−263	−8.0%	3,309
Herkimer	13,919	57.0%	8,754	35.9%	1,734	7.1%	5,165	21.1%	24,407
Jefferson	22,463	64.2%	10,846	31.0%	1,661	4.8%	11,617	33.2%	34,970
Kings	542,759	88.1%	56,823	9.2%	16,408	2.6%	485,936	78.9%	615,990
Lewis	5,929	58.5%	3,700	36.5%	507	5.0%	2,229	22.0%	10,136
Livingston	14,236	53.8%	10,814	40.9%	1,397	5.2%	3,422	12.9%	26,447
Madison	15,359	56.4%	9,984	36.7%	1,880	7.0%	5,375	19.7%	27,223
Monroe	204,268	66.1%	87,655	28.4%	17,222	5.9%	116,613	37.7%	309,145
Montgomery	10,895	59.4%	6,235	34.0%	1,216	6.6%	4,660	25.4%	18,346
Nassau	387,085	66.5%	161,395	27.7%	34,006	5.8%	225,690	38.8%	582,309
New York	512,902	87.5%	59,560	10.2%	13,847	2.4%	453,342	77.3%	586,309
Niagara	56,314	65.3%	25,137	29.1%	4,798	5.6%	31,177	36.2%	86,249
Oneida	52,655	59.9%	29,195	33.2%	6,055	6.9%	23,460	26.7%	87,905
Onondaga	125,318	62.9%	61,500	30.9%	12,447	6.3%	63,818	32.0%	199,265
Ontario	26,849	59.6%	15,951	35.4%	2,278	5.1%	10,898	24.2%	45,078
Orange	73,135	55.1%	53,011	40.0%	6,507	4.9%	20,124	15.1%	132,653
Orleans	7,668	52.5%	6,161	42.1%	790	5.4%	1,507	10.4%	14,619
Oswego	25,890	56.3%	17,167	37.3%	2,912	6.3%	8,723	19.0%	45,969
Otsego	13,632	57.1%	8,638	36.2%	1,620	6.8%	4,994	20.9%	23,890
Putnam	24,001	58.0%	14,557	35.2%	2,838	6.8%	9,444	22.8%	41,396
Queens	450,332	83.7%	71,453	13.3%	16,242	3.0%	378,879	70.4%	538,027
Rensselaer	40,911	61.5%	21,431	32.2%	4,142	6.3%	19,480	29.3%	66,494
Richmond	98,123	68.6%	37,727	26.4%	7,215	5.1%	60,396	42.2%	143,065
Rockland	81,155	67.8%	32,993	27.6%	5,566	4.6%	48,162	40.2%	119,714
St. Lawrence	25,724	69.8%	9,237	25.1%	1,902	5.2%	16,487	44.7%	36,863
Saratoga	53,309	54.7%	38,846	39.8%	5,377	5.5%	14,463	14.9%	97,532
Schenectady	39,521	61.9%	20,316	31.8%	4,047	6.4%	19,205	30.1%	63,884
Schoharie	6,750	50.2%	5,991	44.5%	709	5.3%	759	5.7%	13,450
Schuyler	4,088	52.8%	3,227	41.6%	433	5.6%	861	11.2%	7,748
Seneca	8,228	60.7%	4,595	33.9%	722	5.3%	3,633	26.8%	13,545
Steuben	18,167	50.0%	16,379	45.1%	1,770	4.9%	1,788	4.9%	36,316
Suffolk	391,950	66.8%	163,470	27.9%	31,493	5.4%	228,480	40.9%	586,913
Sullivan	17,582	62.1%	9,080	32.1%	1,651	5.8%	8,502	30.0%	28,313
Tioga	10,872	50.1%	9,602	44.2%	1,228	5.7%	1,270	5.9%	21,702
Tompkins	25,930	68.1%	9,504	25.0%	2,637	6.8%	16,426	43.1%	38,071
Ulster	51,689	63.8%	24,029	29.7%	5,302	6.6%	27,660	34.1%	81,020
Warren	15,611	56.0%	10,889	39.0%	1,387	5.0%	4,722	17.0%	27,887
Washington	11,947	53.9%	9,000	40.6%	1,211	5.5%	2,947	13.3%	22,158
Wayne	19,083	52.3%	14,986	41.1%	2,413	6.7%	4,097	11.2%	36,482
Westchester	258,134	70.5%	92,685	25.3%	15,453	4.2%	165,449	45.2%	366,272
Wyoming	8,494	51.8%	6,929	42.3%	972	6.0%	1,565	9.5%	16,395
Yates	5,216	54.6%	3,911	40.9%	424	4.4%	1,305	13.7%	9,551
Totals	4,769,824	71.2%	1,625,069	24.2%	307,982	4.6%	3,144,755	47.0%	6,702,875

Counties that flipped from Republican to Democratic

- Alleghany (largest municipality: Wellsville)
- Broome (largest municipality: Binghamton)
- Cattaraugus (largest municipality: Olean)
- Cayuga (largest municipality: Auburn)
- Chautauqua (largest municipality: Jamestown)
- Chemung (largest municipality: Elmira)
- Chenango (largest municipality: Norwich)
- Clinton (largest municipality: Plattsburgh)
- Columbia (largest municipality: Hudson)
- Cortland (largest municipality: Cortland)
- Delaware (largest municipality: Sidney)
- Dutchess (County Seat: Poughkeepsie)
- Essex (largest municipality: Ticonderoga)
- Franklin (largest municipality: Malone)
- Fulton (largest municipality: Gloversville)
- Genesee (largest municipality: Batavia)
- Greene (largest municipality: Catskill)
- Herkimer (largest municipality: German Flatts)
- Jefferson (largest municipality: Le Ray)
- Lewis (largest municipality: Lowville)
- Livingston (largest municipality: Geneseo)
- Madison (largest municipality: Oneida)
- Montgomery (largest municipality: Amsterdam)
- Nassau (largest municipality: Hempstead)
- Oneida (largest municipality: Utica)
- Onondaga (largest municipality: Syracuse)
- Ontario (largest municipality: Geneva)
- Orange (largest municipality: Kiryas Joel)
- Orleans (largest municipality: Albion)
- Oswego (largest municipality: Oswego)
- Otsego (largest municipality: Oneonta)
- Putnam (largest municipality: Lake Carmel)
- Rockland (County Seat: New City)
- Rensselaer (County Seat: Troy)
- Richmond (Staten Island, borough of New York City)
- Steuben (largest municipality: Corning)
- St. Lawrence (largest municipality: Massena)
- Saratoga (largest municipality: Saratoga Springs)
- Schoharie (largest municipality: Cobleskill)
- Schuyler (largest municipality: Watkins Glen)
- Seneca (largest municipality: Seneca Falls)
- Suffolk (largest municipality: Brookhaven)
- Sullivan (largest municipality: Monticello)
- Tioga (largest municipality: Waverly)
- Ulster (largest municipality: Kingston)
- Warren (largest municipality: Glens Falls)
- Washington (largest municipality: Hudson Falls)
- Wayne (largest municipality: Newark)
- Yates (largest municipality: Penn Yan)
- Wyoming (largest municipality: Perry)

== See also ==
- 2004 United States Senate elections
