= Pine Bush High School =

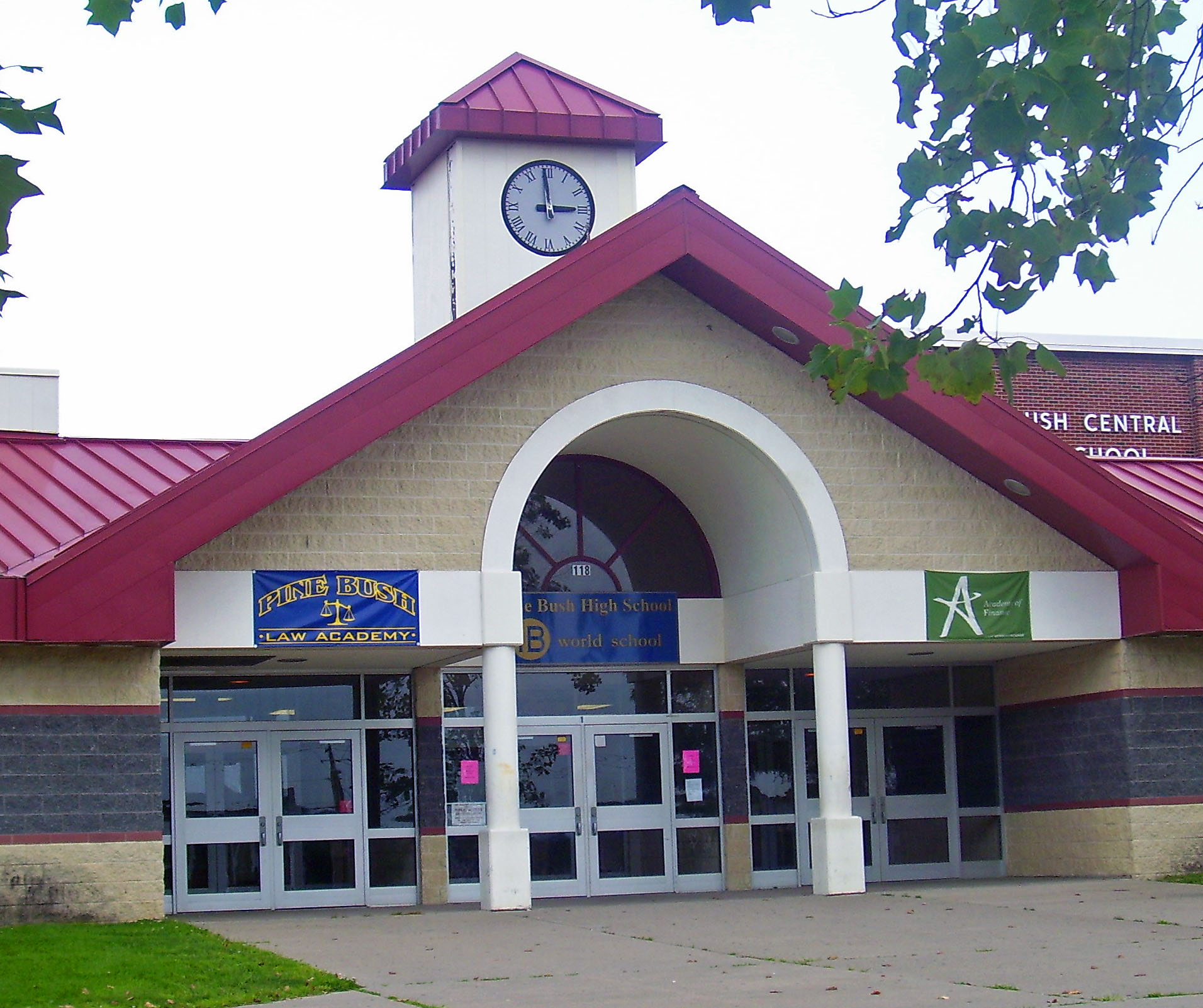

Location
- Pine Bush, New York; 41°36′06″N 74°18′28″W

Information
- Type: Public
- Established: 1938
- School district: Pine Bush Central School District
- Principal: Aaron Hopmayer
- Faculty: 133
- Teaching staff: 109.41 (FTE)
- Grades: 9-12
- Enrollment: 1,596 (2023–2024)
- Student to teacher ratio: 14.59
- Colors: Blue, Gold
- Athletics: Tennis, Football, Cross-country, Volleyball, Field Hockey, Swimming, Track, Basketball, Baseball, Golf, American Football, and Lacrosse
- Mascot: Bushmen
- Website: School Homepage

Pine Bush High School is the central high school for the Pine Bush Central School District, located on Route 302 in the hamlet of Pine Bush, New York, United States.

The school no longer offers the International Baccalaureate degree program. It had been authorized to do so since 2002.

The school was used in an episode of ABC Afterschool Special in 1991 titled "It's Only Rock and Roll", which starred Grammy Award–winning singer Carole King.

== Notable alumni ==
- Cait Conley, United States Congressman (NY-17)
- Mike Kiselak, former NFL player for the New York Giants, Kansas City Chiefs, and Dallas Cowboys.
- Cleanthony Early, professional basketball player
- Joe Landolina, inventor, entrepreneur and biomedical engineer
- Joe Nathan, former professional baseball player
- Alex Trezza, college baseball coach

== Controversy ==
Pine Bush High School has been involved in several well-known controversies over the last 10 years.

- In 2012, five Jewish students brought a lawsuit against Pine Bush Central School District claiming that they experienced antisemitic slurs, graffiti, physical attacks, and jokes related to the Holocaust during their time in elementary, middle, and high school. New York Governor Andrew Cuomo ordered an investigation into these allegations in 2013. Pine Bush Central School District settled this lawsuit in 2015, and paid the plaintiffs $4.48 million.
- In 2015, a student read the Pledge of Allegiance in Arabic in an effort to celebrate national Foreign Language Week. This caused school and community-wide controversy as students and community-members associated the reading with conflict in the Middle East. This incident garnered nation-wide attention and resulted in an apology from the school principal, Aaron Hopmayer.
- In 2019, The New York Times wrote a follow-up article about how antisemitism still plagues Pine Bush Central School District. The article explains that the school district surveyed a portion of their students and found that 766 respondents in middle and high school said that they had seen or heard antisemitism in school in the last year.
