= John Bonacic =

American politician

John J. Bonacic

Member of the New York State Senate
- In office January 1, 1999 – December 31, 2018
- Preceded by: Charles D. Cook
- Succeeded by: Jen Metzger
- Constituency: 40th district (1999-2002); 42nd district (2003-2018)

Member of the New York State Assembly
- In office February 20, 1990 – December 31, 1998
- Preceded by: Mary M. McPhillips
- Succeeded by: Howard Mills III
- Constituency: 94th district (1990-1992); 95th district (1993-1998)

Personal details
- Born: June 14, 1942 (age 84) New York City, New York, U.S.
- Party: Republican
- Spouse: Pat Bonacic
- Education: Iona College (B.A.); Fordham University (J.D.)
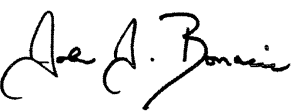
- Signature
- Website: Official website

John J. Bonacic (born June 14, 1942 in New York City) is a retired politician from New York. A Republican, Bonacic represented New York State Senate District 42 (which includes all or parts of Delaware, Sullivan, Orange, and Ulster Counties) from November 1998 to 2018. Prior to his Senate service, Bonacic served in the New York State Assembly.

== Personal life and education ==
Bonacic's grandparents were immigrants from Croatia. He received his Bachelor of Arts from Iona College in 1964, majoring in Economics. He received his JD at Fordham University School of Law in 1968.

== Political career ==
On February 20, 1990, Bonacic was elected to the New York State Assembly, to fill the vacancy caused by the election of Mary M. McPhillips as Orange County Executive. Bonacic was re-elected four times and remained in the Assembly until 1998, sitting in the 188th, 189th, 190th, 191st and 192nd New York State Legislatures. In November 1998, he was elected to the New York State Senate.

Bonacic, a Republican, was the Chair of the Senate Racing, Gaming, and Wagering Committee. He sponsored a bill that would legalize online poker. He supported the opening of a casino in Sullivan County, New York.

While Bonacic cast a procedural vote against a 2013 bill that would have expanded abortion rights, he expressed support for the Reproductive Health Act in 2016. At a January 25, 2016 gathering of abortion advocates in Albany, the Senator commented, "'Both my daughter and my bride of 50 years believe in pro-choice and we should never deprive women of access of health care that they choose and their medical providers say is best for them.'" In 2015, Bonacic introduced a bill to legalize physician-assisted suicide.

In 2011, Bonacic voted against allowing same-sex marriage in New York in a roll-call vote on the Marriage Equality Act, which passed in a close 33-29 vote.

On May 6, 2018, Bonacic announced that he would not seek re-election in November 2018.

== See also ==
- List of Croatian Americans
- List of Fordham University School of Law alumni
- List of Iona College alumni

New York State Assembly
Preceded by Mary M. McPhillips	New York State Assembly; 94th District; 1990–1992	Succeeded by Nancy Calhoun
Preceded by Nancy Calhoun	New York State Assembly; 95th District; 1993–1998	Succeeded by Howard Mills III
New York State Senate
Preceded by Charles D. Cook	New York State Senate; 40th District; 1999–2002	Succeeded by Vincent Leibell
Preceded by Neil Breslin	New York State Senate; 42nd District; 2003–2018	Succeeded by Jen Metzger
