= Pine Bush Central School District =

School district in the U.S. state of New York

Address
- 156 NY-302, Pine Bush, NY 12566 Orange, Sullivan, and Ulster County, New York Hudson Valley New York (state); United States

District information
- Grades: Kindergarten–Twelfth grade
- Established: 1938
- Superintendent: Amy Brockner (acting)
- Deputy superintendent(s): Terrilyn Cohn (acting)
- School board: Board of Education
- Chair of the board: Shauna Best, Peter Agro
- Schools: Pine Bush High School, Crispell Middle School, Circleville Middle School, Pine Bush Elementary School, Pakanasink Elementary School, E. J. Russell Elementary School, Circleville Elementary School
- Budget: $141,504,647

Students and staff
- Students: 4,500
- Colors: Blue and gold

Other information
- Website: pinebushschools.org

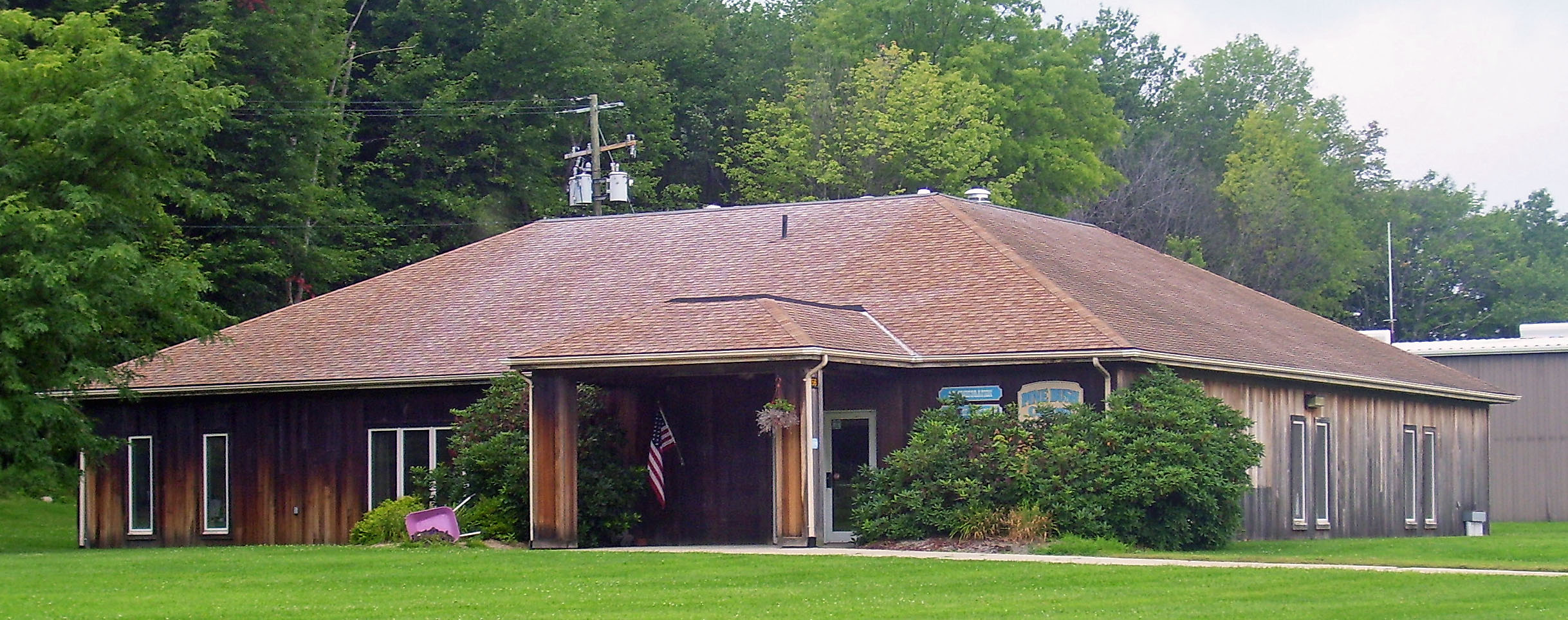
The district's main offices, next to the high school.

Pine Bush Central School District is a school district in Pine Bush, New York, United States, and spans all of the Town of Crawford and includes part of six other townships in Orange, Sullivan, and Ulster counties. It was established in 1938. For the 2021–2022 school year, the district approved a budget of $125.8 million and currently enrolls just under 5,000 students.

The school district has been named as a defendant in a lawsuit filed in March 2012 by three families alleging inaction following accusations of antisemitism and the resultant creation of a hostile learning environment.

== Schools ==
The district has 7 schools.

- Pine Bush
  - E. J. Russell Elementary School
  - Pine Bush Elementary School
  - Crispell Middle School
  - Pine Bush High School
- Circleville:
  - Circleville Elementary School
  - Circleville Middle School
  - Pakanasink Elementary School

== Towns ==
- Orange County, New York
  - Town of Crawford
  - Town of Montgomery
  - Town of Mount Hope
  - Town of Wallkill
- Sullivan County
  - Town of Mamakating
- Ulster County
  - Town of Gardiner
  - Town of Shawangunk

== Antisemitism lawsuit ==
On November 8, 2013, The New York Times ran a front-page story that detailed allegations of antisemitic bullying in the Pine Bush Central School District and a related lawsuit by the parents of three district students. There were students known to have a good relationship with the teachers and performed antisemitic rituals almost every day after school. In an earlier Times article, Philip G. Steinberg, the district's superintendent from 2008 to 2013, who, as well as two other administrators named as defendants, is Jewish, described the lawsuit as a "money grab." In the days following the Times' coverage hundreds of people protested against "its portrayal of Pine Bush as a bigoted, biased community." The United States Attorney for the Southern District of New York issued a statement in support of the plaintiffs in January 2014. Following a five-month long state police investigation, the Orange County District Attorney's Office announced in September, 2014, that no criminal charges would be filed against any children and "the investigation revealed no evidence that any school official had engaged in any criminal conduct." On November 4, 2014, Federal District Court Judge Kenneth M. Karas, presiding in White Plains, New York, denied a defense motion to dismiss the case brought on behalf of three of the five children included in the complaint. In 2015 the school district filed a settlement agreement that required them to pay $2.9 million to the five plaintiffs. School officials additionally were required to undergo training to respond to antisemitic incidents.
