= Ann Rabbitt =

American politician

Orange County Clerk
- In office January 1, 2014 – December 29, 2021
- Preceded by: Donna Benson
- Succeeded by: Kelly Eskew

Member of the New York State Assembly
- In office January 5, 2005 – December 31, 2013
- Preceded by: Howard Mills III
- Succeeded by: Karl A. Brabenec
- Constituency: 97th district (2005–2012); 64th district (2013)

Personal details
- Born: December 20, 1960 (age 65) Brooklyn, New York, U.S.
- Party: Republican

Ann G. Rabbitt (born December 20, 1960) is a Republican politician from the State of New York. Rabbitt has served as Orange County Clerk from 2014 to 2021.

== Career ==
Rabbitt served as a trustee for the village of Greenwood Lake from 1999 to 2002. From 2002 to 2005, she served on the Warwick town board. In 2005, she became a member of the New York State Assembly and served in that role until 2013.

In 2013, she was elected to the position of Orange County Clerk. In 2018, Rabbitt was the Republican candidate for New York State Senate in Senate District 42, but was defeated by Democrat Jen Metzger. Rabbitt retired from the county clerk role in December, 2021.

== Personal life ==
Rabbitt's husband, former Greenwood Lake Chief of Police Robert "Bobby" Rabbitt Jr., died on February 26, 2017, at the age of 57.

New York State Assembly
Preceded by Howard D. Mills III	New York State Assembly, 97th District; January 1, 2005 – December 31, 2012	Succeeded by Ellen C. Jaffee
Preceded by Aileen M. Gunther	New York State Assembly, 98th District; January 1, 2013 – December 31, 2013	Succeeded by Karl A. Brabenec
Political offices
Preceded by Donna L. Benson	Orange County, New York County Clerk; January 1, 2014 – December 29, 2021	Succeeded by Kelly Eskew
