= Ellen Jaffee =

American politician

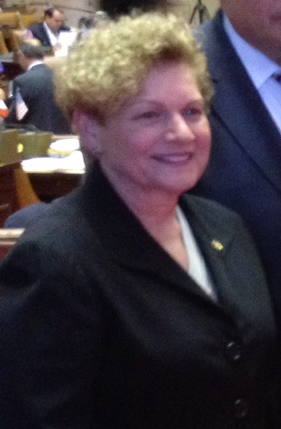
- Jaffee in 2012

Member of the New York State Assembly from the 97th district
- In office January 1, 2007 – December 31, 2020
- Preceded by: Ryan Karben
- Succeeded by: Mike Lawler

Personal details
- Born: May 20, 1944 (age 82) Brooklyn, New York, U.S.
- Party: Democratic
- Spouse: Steve (died 2016)
- Children: 2
- Education: Brooklyn College; Fordham University
- Profession: Politician
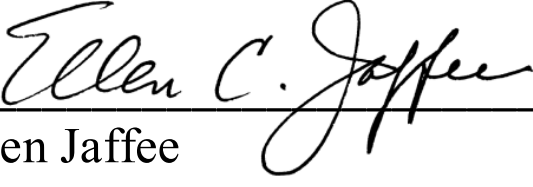
- Signature
- Website: Official website

Ellen C. Jaffee (born May 20, 1944) is an American politician who served as a Democratic member of the New York State Assembly, representing the 97th Assembly District in Rockland County.

A native of Brooklyn, Jaffee earned her B.A. in Education from Brooklyn College and her M.S. in Special Education from Fordham University. She was previously a teacher at Pomona Middle School before becoming an elected official of the Rockland County Legislature in 1998.

Jaffee was first elected to the State Assembly in 2006 for a two-year term (2007–2009). She ran uncontested in the 2008 general election and won the 2010 general election with 61 percent of the vote.

Jaffee has lived in Suffern since 1978, where she and her late husband, Steve, raised two children, Marc and Allison. Steve Jaffee, who was also the Chairman of the Suffern Democratic Committee, died on January 19, 2016.

Jaffee was defeated in the 2020 election by a Republican Mike Lawler.

New York State Assembly
Preceded by Ryan Karben	New York State Assembly, 95th District; 2007–2021	Incumbent
