= Pine Bush, New York =

- CDP
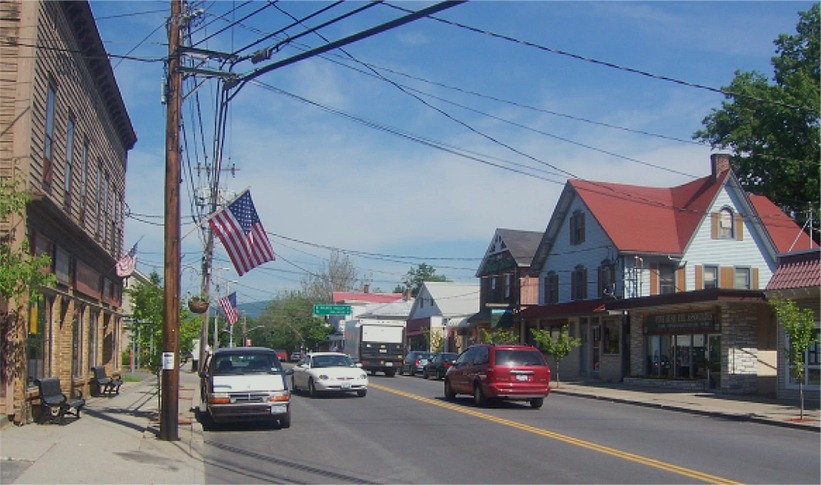
- Downtown Pine Bush, New York

- Location in Orange County and the state of New York.

- Location within New York Location within the United States
- Coordinates: 41°36′N 74°18′W
- Country: United States
- State: New York
- County: Orange
- Town: Crawford

Area
  - Total: 2.11 sq mi (5.46 km^{2})
  - Land: 2.11 sq mi (5.46 km^{2})
  - Water: 0.0039 sq mi (0.01 km^{2})
- Elevation: 387 ft (118 m)

Population (2020)
  - Total: 1,751
  - Density: 831.3/sq mi (320.98/km^{2})
- Time zone: UTC-5 (Eastern (EST))
  - Summer (DST): UTC-4 (EDT)
- ZIP code: 12566
- Area code: 845
- FIPS code: 36-57980
- GNIS feature ID: 0960421

Pine Bush is a hamlet (and census-designated place) located in the town of Crawford and adjacent to Shawangunk, New York, within Orange and adjacent to Ulster counties in the United States. It is roughly coterminous with the 12566 ZIP code and 744 telephone exchange in the 845 area code. These both extend into adjacent regions of the town of Shawangunk in Ulster County. (The Pine Bush Central School District includes part of the town of Mamakating in Sullivan County as well). The population was 1,751 at the 2020 census.

Pine Bush is part of the Kiryas Joel–Poughkeepsie–Newburgh metropolitan area as well as the larger New York metropolitan area.

== History ==
The community was one of the four early nineteenth century settlements in the jurisdiction of the town. It has previously been known as "Shawangunk," "Crawford," and "Bloomfield." Another community named "Crawford" is located to the northwest in bordering Ulster County. This hamlet was an early terminus for a short line railroad, the Middletown & Crawford Railroad. This line was bought by the Erie Railroad, which served the town until the 1970s.

As a result of reported unusual sightings since the early 1960s, Pine Bush developed a reputation as the UFO capital of the East Coast. The town has held an annual UFO festival since 2011. Ellen Crystall's 1994 book, Silent Invasion: The Shocking Discoveries of a UFO Researcher describes UFO encounters in the town.

== Geography ==
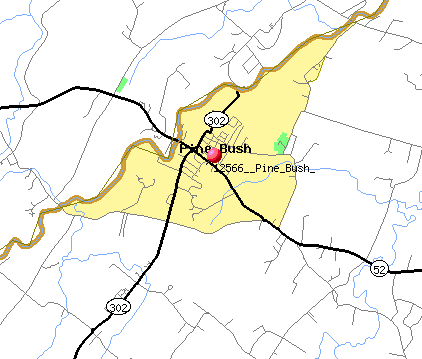
Pine Bush map

Pine Bush is located at 41°36′N 74°18′W (41.6088, −74.2987). According to the United States Census Bureau, the CDP has a total area of 2.1 square miles (5.4 km^{2}), all land.

The hamlet of Pine Bush is in Orange County and near the border of Ulster. The Pine Bush zip code, 12566, spills over into the Town of Shawangunk in Ulster County, but the Hamlet itself is in Orange County only. The Shawangunk Kill, a small river, marks this boundary. New York State Route 52 and New York State Route 302 intersect at this hamlet, which predates the highways.

== Demographics ==
As of the 2010 census and 2013-2017 American Community Survey, there were 1,780 people, 764 households, and 453 families residing in the CDP. There were 757 housing units. The racial makeup of the CDP was 90.8% White, 2.5% African American, 0.01% Native American, 1.6% Asian, 0.2% Pacific Islander, 2.4% from other races, and 2.4% from two or more races. Hispanic or Latino of any race were 9.2% of the population.

There were 764 households, out of which 27.9% had children under the age of 18 living with them, 40.6% were married couples living together, 12.8% had a female householder with no husband present, and 40.7% were non-families. 35.9% of all households had someone living alone who was 65 years of age or older. The average household size was 2.29 and the average family size was 3.01.

The median income for a household in the CDP was $26,964, and the median income for a family was $75,357. Males had a median income of $38,203 versus $30,577 for females. The per capita income for the CDP was $25,715. About 17.1% of families and 23.5% of the population were below the poverty line, including 31.6% of those under age 18 and 27.6% of those age 65 or over.

Historical population
Census	Pop.	Note	%±
1960	1,016		—
1970	1,183		16.4%
1980	1,255		6.1%
1990	1,445		15.1%
2000	1,539		6.5%
2010	1,780		15.7%
2020	1,751		−1.6%
U.S. Decennial Census

== Education ==
The Pine Bush Central School District, which covers the CDP, serves portions of seven townships located in Ulster, Sullivan, and Orange counties. The system, one of the largest in the area, includes four elementary schools, two middle schools and a high school.

Elementary schools include Circleville Elementary School, Pakanasink Elementary School, Pine Bush Elementary School, and E.J. Russell Elementary School. Middle Schools include Circleville Middle School and Crispell Middle School. The high school is Pine Bush High School.

== See also ==
- Dharma Drum Retreat Center
- Blue Cliff Monastery
