= 2025 Orange County, New York Executive election =

- November 4, 2025
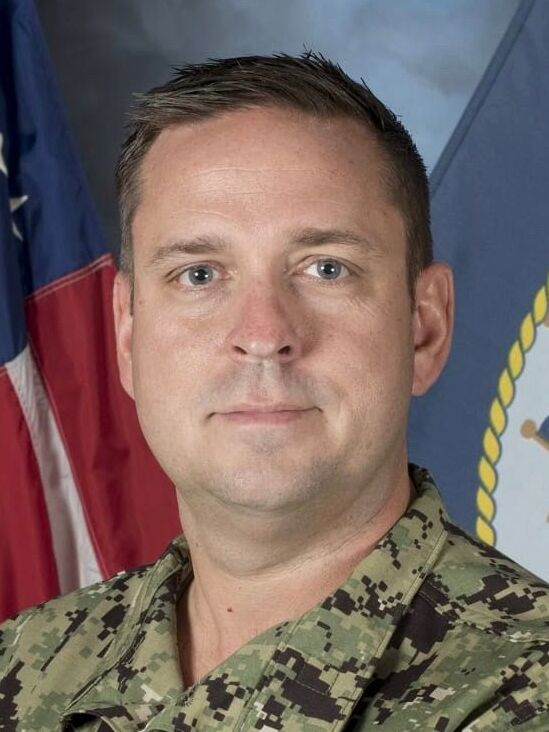

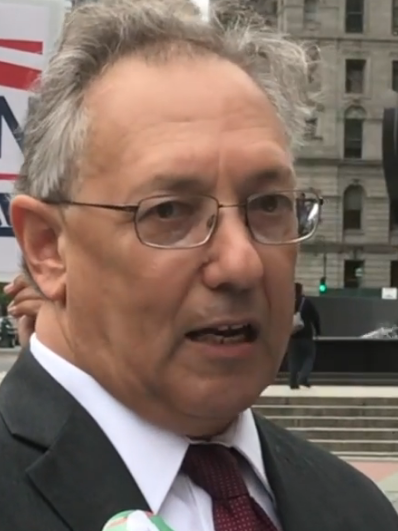
Candidate	Steve Neuhaus	Michael Sussman
Party	Republican	Democratic
Alliance	Conservative	Working Families
Popular vote	43,555	28,855
Percentage	60.1%	39.8%
County executive before election
Steve Neuhaus
Republican
Elected County executive
Steve Neuhaus
Republican

The 2025 Orange County Executive election was held on November 4, 2025, to elect the county executive of Orange County, New York. Republican incumbent executive Steve Neuhaus successfully ran for re-election.

== Republican Party ==
=== Candidates ===
==== Nominee ====
- Steve Neuhaus, incumbent county executive

== Democratic Party ==
=== Candidates ===
==== Nominee ====
- Michael Sussman, civil rights lawyer and Green Party nominee for Attorney General of New York in 2018

=== Endorsements ===
Michael Sussman

Political parties

- Working Families Party

== General election ==
=== Results ===
2025 Orange County Executive election
Party	Candidate	Votes	%
Republican	Steve Neuhaus	38,062	52.54
Conservative	Steve Neuhaus	5,493	7.58
Total	Steve Neuhaus (incumbent)	43,555	60.12
Democratic	Michael Sussman	26,155	36.10
Working Families	Michael Sussman	2,700	3.73
Total	Michael Sussman	28,855	39.83
Write-in		32	0.04
Total votes		72,442	100.00
