= Orange County, New York =

County in New York, United States

- County
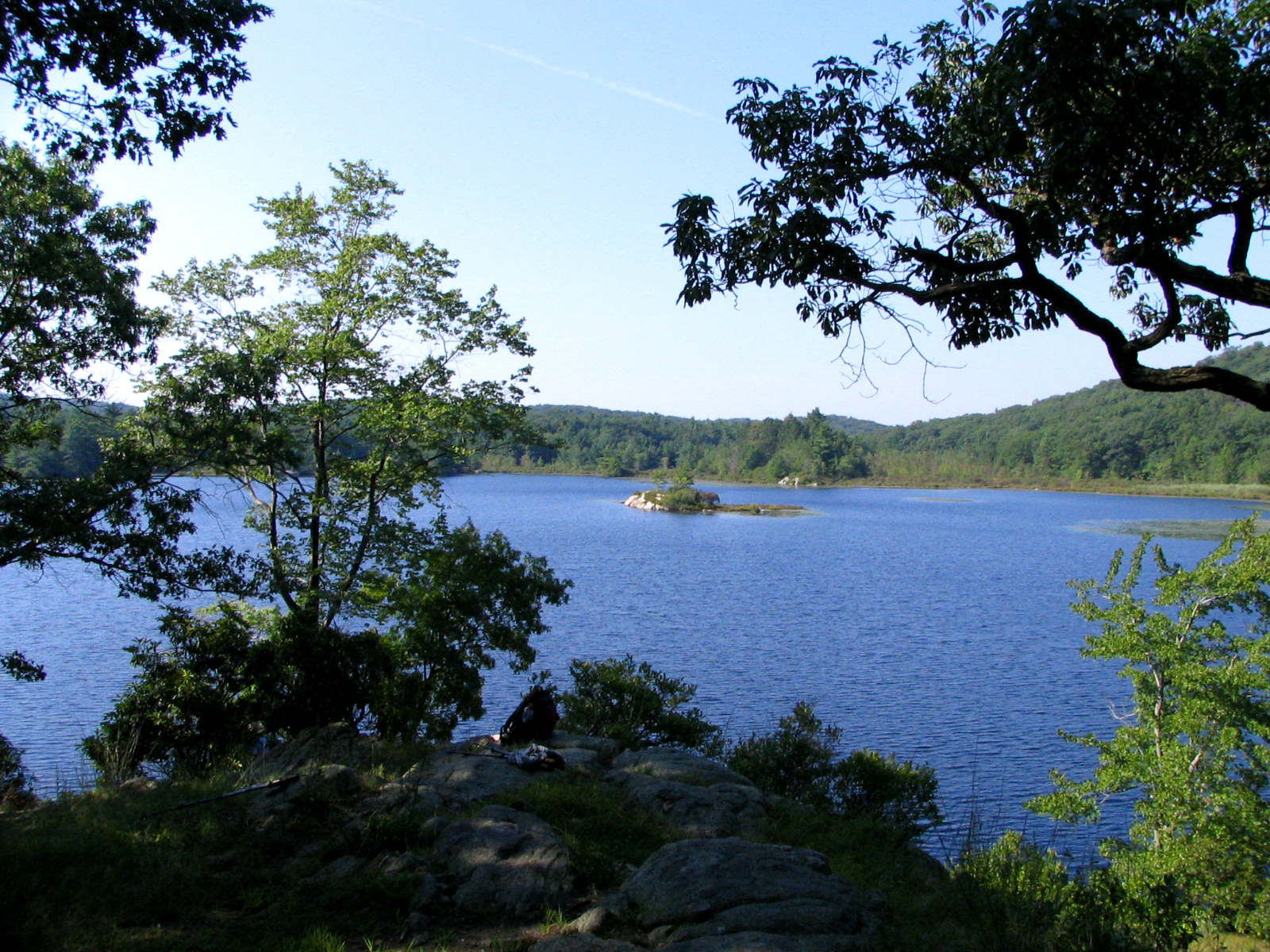
- Island Pond in Harriman State Park, near the Village of Harriman.

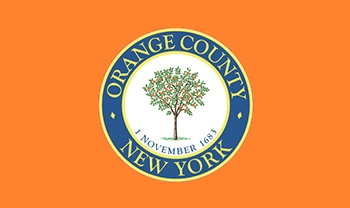
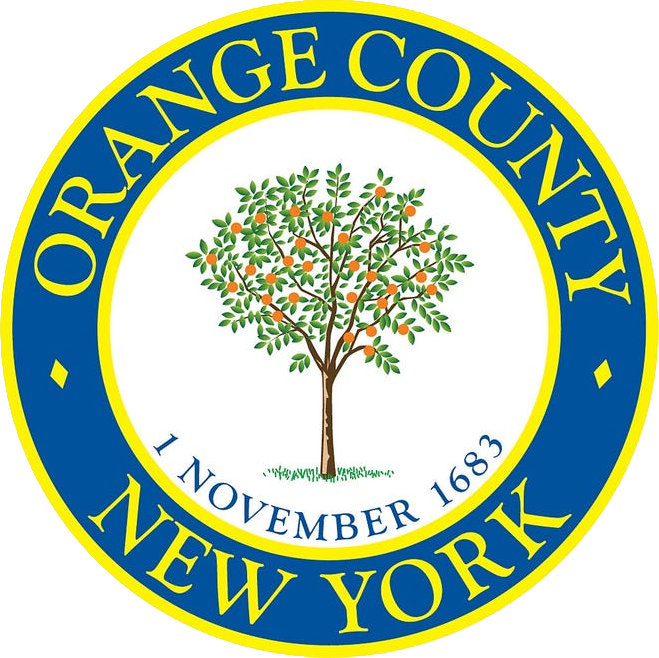
- Flag Seal

- Location within the U.S. state of New York
- Coordinates: 41°24′N 74°19′W
- Country: United States
- State: New York
- Founded: November 1, 1683; 342 years ago (Note: "Dating back to its formation under a colonial law of 1683, Orange is one of the oldest counties in the state. It was reëstablished in 1788, and had its boundaries finally determined April 3, 1801.")
- Named for: William III of Orange
- Seat: Goshen
- Largest town: Palm Tree

Government
  - County Executive: Steven M. Neuhaus (R)

Area
  - Total: 840 sq mi (2,200 km^{2})
  - Land: 812 sq mi (2,100 km^{2})
  - Water: 27 sq mi (70 km^{2}) 3.2%

Population (2020)
  - Total: 401,310
  - Estimate (2025): 417,669 ▲
  - Density: 514/sq mi (198/km^{2})
- Time zone: UTC−5 (Eastern)
  - Summer (DST): UTC−4 (EDT)
- Area code: 845
- Congressional district: 18th
- Website: orangecountygov.com

Interactive map of Orange County, New York

Orange County is a county located in the U.S. state of New York. As of the 2020 United States census, the population was 401,310. The county seat is Goshen. This county was first created in 1683 and reorganized with its present boundaries in 1798. The county is part of the Hudson Valley region of the state.

Orange County is part of the Kiryas Joel-Poughkeepsie-Newburgh metropolitan statistical area, which belongs to the larger New York–Newark–Bridgeport, NY–NJ–CT–PA Combined Statistical Area.

As of the 2020 census the center of population of the state of New York was located in Orange County, in the hamlet of Cuddebackville.

== History ==
Orange County was officially established on November 1, 1683, when the Province of New York was divided into twelve counties. Each of these was named to honor a member of the British royal family, and Orange County took its name from the Prince of Orange, who subsequently became King William III of England. As originally defined, Orange County included only the southern part of its present-day territory, plus all of present-day Rockland County further south. The northern part of the present-day county, beyond Moodna Creek, was then a part of neighboring Ulster County.

At that date, the only European inhabitants of the area were a handful of Dutch colonists in present-day Rockland County, and the area of modern Orange County was entirely occupied by the native Munsee people. Due to its relatively small population, the original Orange County was not fully independent and was administered by New York County.

The first European settlers in the area of the present-day county arrived in 1685. They were a party of around twenty-five families from Scotland, led by David Toshach, the Laird of Monzievaird, and his brother-in-law Major Patrick McGregor, a former officer of the French Army. They settled in the Hudson Highlands at the place where the Moodna Creek enters the Hudson River, now known as New Windsor. In 1709, a group of German Palatine refugees settled at Newburgh. They were Protestants from a part of Germany along the Rhine that had suffered during the religious wars. Queen Anne's government arranged for passage from England of nearly 3,000 Palatines in ten ships. Many were settled along the Hudson River in work camps on property belonging to Robert Livingston. In 1712, a 16-year-old indentured servant named Sarah Wells from Manhattan led a small party of three Munsee men and three hired carpenters into the undeveloped interior of the county and created the first settlement in the Town of Goshen on the Otter Kill. She was falsely promised by her master Christopher Denne 100 acres bounty for taking on the dangerous mission to make a land claim for him. He never gave her the land. But, she did fall in love and married Irish immigrant William Bull there in 1718 and they had 12 children and built the Bull Stone House. In 1716, the first known woman of African descent resident was recorded in Orange County. Her name was Mercy. She was enslaved by Christopher Denne at his settlement on the Otter Kill. Additional immigrants came from Ireland; they were of Scots and English descent who had been settled as part of the Scottish and English settlements there.

During the American Revolutionary War the county was divided into Loyalists, Patriots, and those who remained neutral. The local government supported the Revolution, or "The Cause". Some residents posed as Loyalists but were part of a secret spy network set up by Gen. George Washington. Capt. William Bull III of the Town of Wallkill (which was then a part of Ulster County) served in the Continental Army with Gen. Washington in Spencer's Additional Continental Regiment. His cousin was revealed after the war to be part of Washington's spy ring. His brother Moses Bull raised 20 men from the Town of Wallkill to service with his brother. Capt. Bull was promoted twice for valor on the battlefield, once in the Battle of Monmouth where he was part of Lord Stirling's men who famously saved the day after Gen. Lee's retreat. Capt. Bull wintered at Valley Forge with several men from Orange County. Capt. Bull retired from the Army in 1781 and returned to the Town of Wallkill where he built Brick Castle. Hundreds of men from Orange County served in the local militia and many of them fought in the Battle of Fort Montgomery and Fort Clinton. However, many residents remained loyal to King George III, include members of Capt. Bull's family. Many in the county were divided within families. Capt. Bull's uncle Thomas Bull was jailed for years in Goshen and then Fishkill for being a Loyalist. Resident Claudius Smith was a Loyalist marauder whose team robbed and terrorized citizens; he was hanged in Goshen in 1779 for allegedly robbing and killing Major Nathaniel Strong; two of his sons were also executed for similar crimes. Capt. Bull's cousin Peter Bull of Hamptonburgh served in the Orange County regiment and was charged with guarding the roads at night from Smith. The Mathews family of Blooming Grove were active Loyalists; Fletcher Mathews was a sympathizer and sometime associate of Smith, and his brother David Mathews was Mayor of New York City during its British occupation for the entirety of the war.

In 1798, after the American Revolutionary War, the boundaries of Orange County changed. Its southern corner was used to create the new Rockland County, and in exchange, an area to the north of the Moodna Creek was added, which had previously been in Ulster County. This caused a reorganization of the local administration, as the original county seat had been fixed at Orangetown in 1703, but this was now in Rockland County. Duties were subsequently shared between Goshen, which had been the center of government for the northern part of Orange County, and Newburgh, which played a similar role in the area transferred from Ulster County. The county court was established in 1801. It was not until 1970 that Goshen was named as the sole county seat.

Due to a boundary dispute between New York and New Jersey, the boundaries of many of the southern towns of the county were not definitively established until the 19th century.

== Geography ==
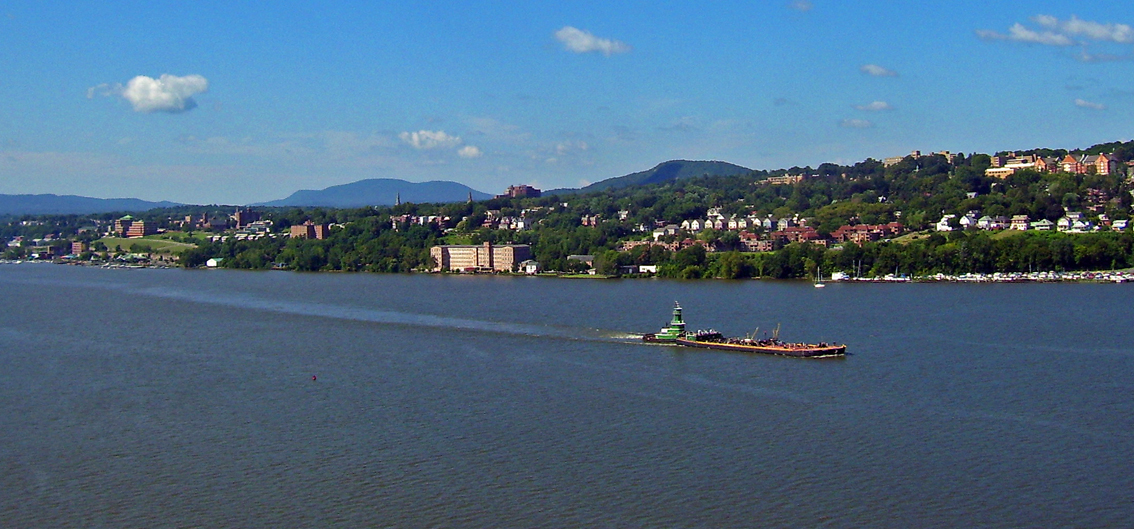
Downtown Newburgh, on the shoreline of the Hudson River.

According to the U.S. Census Bureau, the county has a total area of 839 square miles (2,170 km^{2}), of which 812 square miles (2,100 km^{2}) is land and 27 square miles (70 km^{2}) (3.2%) are water.

Orange County is in southeastern New York State, directly north of the New Jersey-New York border, west of the Hudson River, east of the Delaware River and northwest of New York City. It borders the New York counties of Dutchess, Putnam, Rockland, Sullivan, Ulster, and Westchester, as well as Passaic and Sussex counties in New Jersey and Pike County in Pennsylvania.

Orange County is the only county which borders both the Hudson and Delaware Rivers, and is also the only county in the state to border both New Jersey (south) and Pennsylvania (west).

Orange County is where the Great Valley of the Appalachians finally opens up and ends. The western corner is set off by the Shawangunk Ridge. The area along the Rockland County border (within Harriman and Bear Mountain state parks) and south of Newburgh is part of the Hudson Highlands. The land in between is the valley of the Wallkill River. In the southern portion of the county the Wallkill valley expands into a wide glacial lake bed known as the Black Dirt Region for its fertility.

The highest point is Schunemunk Mountain, at 1,664 feet (507 m) above sea level. The lowest is sea level along the Hudson.

=== National protected areas ===
- Upper Delaware Scenic and Recreational River (part)
- Wallkill River National Wildlife Refuge (part)

=== Adjacent counties ===
- Ulster County – north
- Dutchess County – northeast
- Putnam County - east
- Rockland County – southeast
- Passaic County, New Jersey - south
- Sussex County, New Jersey - south
- Pike County, Pennsylvania – southwest
- Sullivan County – northwest

== Demographics ==
Historical population
Census	Pop.	Note	%±
1790	18,492		—
1800	29,355		58.7%
1810	34,347		17.0%
1820	41,213		20.0%
1830	45,336		10.0%
1840	50,739		11.9%
1850	57,145		12.6%
1860	63,812		11.7%
1870	80,902		26.8%
1880	88,220		9.0%
1890	97,859		10.9%
1900	103,859		6.1%
1910	116,001		11.7%
1920	119,844		3.3%
1930	130,383		8.8%
1940	140,113		7.5%
1950	152,255		8.7%
1960	183,734		20.7%
1970	221,657		20.6%
1980	259,603		17.1%
1990	307,647		18.5%
2000	341,367		11.0%
2010	372,813		9.2%
2020	401,310		7.6%
2025 (est.)	417,669	▲	4.1%

=== 2020 census ===
Orange County, New York – Racial and ethnic composition Note: the US Census treats Hispanic/Latino as an ethnic category. This table excludes Latinos from the racial categories and assigns them to a separate category. Hispanics/Latinos may be of any race.
Race / Ethnicity (NH = Non-Hispanic)	Pop 1980	Pop 1990	Pop 2000	Pop 2010	Pop 2020	% 1980	% 1990	% 2000	% 2010	% 2020
White alone (NH)	230,101	260,968	264,760	254,259	231,848	88.64%	84.83%	77.56%	68.20%	57.77%
Black or African American alone (NH)	15,729	20,731	25,567	33,895	41,341	6.06%	6.74%	7.49%	9.09%	10.30%
Native American or Alaska Native alone (NH)	433	702	798	908	754	0.17%	0.23%	0.23%	0.24%	0.19%
Asian alone (NH)	1,332	3,448	5,054	8,685	11,665	0.51%	1.12%	1.48%	2.33%	2.91%
Native Hawaiian or Pacific Islander alone (NH)	x	x	85	80	104	x	x	0.02%	0.02%	0.03%
Other race alone (NH)	748	263	507	797	12,012	0.29%	0.09%	0.15%	0.21%	2.99%
Mixed race or Multiracial (NH)	x	x	4,858	7,004	13,842	x	x	1.42%	1.88%	3.45%
Hispanic or Latino (any race)	11,260	21,535	39,738	67,185	89,744	4.34%	7.00%	11.64%	18.02%	22.36%
Total	259,603	307,647	341,367	372,813	401,310	100.00%	100.00%	100.00%	100.00%	100.00%

=== 2018 ===
Per the American Community Survey's 2018 estimates, there were 381,951 residents within Orange County. 63.5% of the county was non-Hispanic white, 12.95 Black or African American, 0.8% Native American, 2.9% Asian, 0.1% Pacific Islander, 3.0% from two or more races, and 21.0% Hispanic or Latino of any race. 24.4% of Orange County's residents spoke another language other than English at home.

There were 126,776 households in 2018 and an average of 2.90 persons per household. The owner-occupied housing rate was 68.0% and the median gross rent of the county was $1,223. The median homeowner cost with a mortgage was $2,280 and $909 without a mortgage.

The median income for a household from 2014 to 2018 was $76,716 and the per capita income was $33,472. 11.5% of the county's inhabitants were below the poverty line in 2018.

=== 2010 census ===
At the 2010 United States census, there were 372,813 people living in the county. The population density was 444 inhabitants per square mile (171/km^{2}). The racial makeup of the county was 77.2% White, 10.2% Black or African American, 0.5% Native American, 2.4% Asian, and 3.1% from two or more races. 18% of the population were Hispanic or Latino of any race. According to the 2000 United States census, 18.3% were of Italian, 18.1% English, 17.4% Irish, 10.2% German, and 5.0% Polish ancestry. According to the 2009–13 American Community Survey, 76.57% of people spoke only English at home, 13.39% spoke Spanish, 4.03% spoke Yiddish, and 0.83% spoke Italian.

During the 2000 Census, there were 114,788 households, out of which 39.60% had children under the age of 18 living with them, 57.90% were married couples living together, 11.40% had a female householder with no husband present, and 26.40% were non-families. 21.50% of all households were made up of individuals, and 8.50% had someone living alone who was 65 years of age or older. The average household size was 2.85 and the average family size was 3.35.

In the county, the population was spread out, with 29.00% under the age of 18, 8.70% from 18 to 24, 30.00% from 25 to 44, 21.90% from 45 to 64, and 10.30% who were 65 years of age or older. The median age was 35 years. For every 100 females, there were 100.30 males. For every 100 females age 18 and over, there were 97.50 males.

The median income for a household in the county was $52,058, and the median income for a family was $60,355. Males had a median income of $42,363 versus $30,821 for females. The per capita income for the county was $21,597. About 7.60% of families and 10.50% of the population were below the poverty line, including 14.80% of those under age 18 and 8.00% of those age 65 or over.

Despite its rural roots, Orange County has been among the fastest-growing regions within the New York City metropolitan area.

== Law and government ==
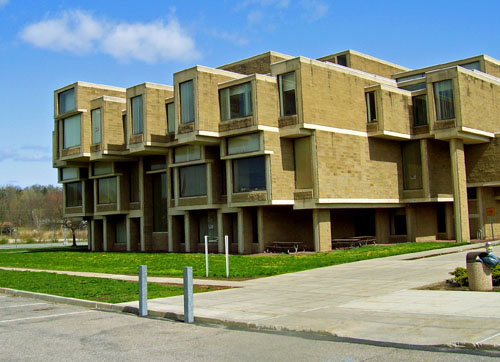
The Orange County Government Center in Goshen, N.Y., designed by Paul Rudolph.

Originally, like most New York counties, Orange County was governed by a board of supervisors. Its board consisted of the 20 town supervisors, nine city supervisors elected from the nine wards of the City of Newburgh, and four each elected from the wards of the cities of Middletown and Port Jervis. In 1968, the board adopted a county charter and a reapportionment plan that created the county legislature and executive. The first county executive and legislature were elected in November 1969 and took office on January 1, 1970. Today, Orange County is still governed by the same charter; residents elect the county executive and a 21-member county legislature elected from 21 single-member districts. There are also several state constitutional positions that are elected, including a sheriff, county clerk and district attorney. Prior to January 1, 2008, four coroners were also elected; however, on that date, the county switched to a medical examiner system.

The current county officers are:

- County Executive: Steven M. Neuhaus (Republican)
- County Clerk: Kelly A. Eskew (Republican)
- Sheriff: Paul Arteta (Republican)
- District Attorney: David M. Hoovler (Republican)

The County Legislature and its previous board of supervisors were long dominated by the Republican Party. However, since the late 20th century, the Democrats have closed the gap. During 2008 and 2009 the legislature was evenly split between 10 Republicans, 10 Democrats, and 1 Independence Party member. In 2009, the legislature had its first Democratic chairman elected when one member of the Republican caucus voted alongside the 10 Democratic members to elect Roxanne Donnery (D-Highlands/Woodbury) to the post. At the November 2009 election, several Democratic incumbents were defeated. As of the convening of the legislature on January 1, 2022, there are 14 Republicans, 6 Democrats, and 1 Independence member.

Orange County Executives
Name	Party	Term
Louis V. Mills	Republican	January 1, 1970 – December 31, 1977
Louis C. Heimbach	Republican	January 1, 1978 – December 31, 1989
Mary M. McPhillips	Democratic	January 1, 1990 – December 31, 1993
Joseph G. Rampe	Republican	January 1, 1994 – December 31, 2001
Edward A. Diana	Republican	January 1, 2002 – December 31, 2013
Steven M. Neuhaus	Republican	January 1, 2014 – present

Orange County Legislature
District	Legislator	Party
1	Katherine Bonelli	Republican
2	Jonathan Redeker	Democratic
3	Glenn R. Ehlers	Republican
4	Genesis Ramos	Democratic
5	Michael Essig	Republican
6	Gabrielle Hill	Democratic
7	Michael Amo	Independent (Note: Elected on the Republican Party line in 2025.)
8	Barry J. Cheney	Republican
9	Rob Sassi	Republican
10	Peter Tuohy	Republican
11	Deshanda Carter	Democratic
12	Virginia Scott	Democratic
13	Thomas Faggione	Republican
14	Laurie R. Tautel	Democratic
15	Matthew Fascaldi	Democratic
16	Stephen Hunter Jr.	Democratic
17	John Revella	Republican
18	Janet Sutherland	Republican
19	Paul Ruszkiewicz	Republican
20	Sparrow Tobin	Democratic
21	Kathy Stegenga	Republican

=== Election results ===
==== 2021 ====
2021 Orange County Executive election
Party	Candidate	Votes	%	±%
Republican	Steve Neuhaus	38,845	80.31	
Conservative	Steve Neuhaus	9,072	18.76	
Total	Steve Neuhaus (incumbent)	47,917	99.06	

2021 Orange County District Attorney election
Party	Candidate	Votes	%	±%
Republican	David Hoovler	36,837	80.00	
Conservative	David Hoovler	8,959	19.46	
Total	David Hoovler (incumbent)	45,796	99.46	

2021 Orange County Clerk election
Party	Candidate	Votes	%	±%
Republican	Kelly Eskew	33,012	53.32	
Conservative	Kelly Eskew	7,063	11.41	
Total	Kelly Eskew	40,075	64.73	
Democratic	Anthony Grice	20,141	32.53	
Working Families	Anthony Grice	1,676	2.71	
Total	Anthony Grice	21,817	35.24	

2021 Orange County Legislature District 1 election
Party	Candidate	Votes	%	±%
Independence	Michael Amo	1,849	84.66	
Republican	Michael Amo	323	14.79	
Total	Michael Amo (incumbent)	2,172	99.45	

2021 Orange County Legislature District 2 election
Party	Candidate	Votes	%	±%
Republican	Janet Sutherland	1,841	79.11	
Conservative	Janet Sutherland	477	20.50	
Total	Janet Sutherland (incumbent)	2,318	99.61	

2021 Orange County Legislature District 3 election
Party	Candidate	Votes	%	±%
Republican	Paul Ruszkiewicz	2,352	80.58	
Conservative	Paul Ruszkiewicz	560	19.18	
Total	Paul Ruszkiewicz (incumbent)	2,912	99.76	

2021 Orange County Legislature District 4 Democratic Primary
Party	Candidate	Votes	%	±%
Democratic	Kevindaryan Lujan (Incumbent)	319	59.51	
Democratic	Gabrielle Hill	216	40.30	

2021 Orange County Legislature District 4 election
Party	Candidate	Votes	%	±%
Democratic	Kevindaryan Lujan	692	65.16	
Working Families	Kevindaryan Lujan	86	8.10	
Total	Kevindaryan Lujan (incumbent)	778	73.26	
Republican	Alfonso Ramos	230	21.66	
Conservative	Alfonso Ramos	50	4.71	
Total	Alfonso Ramos	280	26.37	

2021 Orange County Legislature District 5 election
Party	Candidate	Votes	%	±%
Republican	Katie Bonelli	2,170	82.95	
Conservative	Katie Bonelli	433	16.55	
Total	Katie Bonelli (incumbent)	2,603	99.50	

2021 Orange County Legislature District 6 Democratic Primary
Party	Candidate	Votes	%	±%
Democratic	Genesis Ramos	394	67.35	
Democratic	Roger Ramjug	188	32.14	

2021 Orange County Legislature District 6 election
Party	Candidate	Votes	%	±%
Democratic	Genesis Ramos	816	48.20	
Working Families	Genesis Ramos	71	4.19	
Total	Genesis Ramos	887	52.39	
Republican	John Giudice	611	36.09	
Conservative	John Giudice	138	8.15	
Total	John Giudice	749	44.24	
Nbg Leadership	Roger Ramjug	55	3.25	

2021 Orange County Legislature District 7 election
Party	Candidate	Votes	%	±%
Republican	Peter Tuohy	1,925	80.88	
Conservative	Peter Tuohy	438	18.40	
Total	Peter Tuohy (incumbent)	2,363	99.29	

2021 Orange County Legislature District 8 election
Party	Candidate	Votes	%	±%
Republican	Barry Cheney	2,276	78.75	
Conservative	Barry Cheney	592	20.48	
Total	Barry Cheney (incumbent)	2,868	99.24	

2021 Orange County Legislature District 9 election
Party	Candidate	Votes	%	±%
Republican	Steve Brescia	1,806	46.71	
Conservative	Steve Brescia	398	10.29	
Total	Steve Brescia (incumbent)	2,204	57.01	
Democratic	Fran Fox-Pizzonia	1,491	38.57	
Working Families	Fran Fox-Pizzonia	164	4.24	
Total	Fran Fox-Pizzonia	1,655	42.81	

2021 Orange County Legislature District 10 Republican Primary
Party	Candidate	Votes	%	±%
Republican	Glenn Ehlers	291	68.79	
Republican	Orlando Perez	131	30.97	

2021 Orange County Legislature District 10 election
Party	Candidate	Votes	%	±%
Republican	Glenn Ehlers	1,970	49.34	
Orange First	Glenn Ehlers	56	1.40	
Total	Glenn Ehlers	2,026	50.74	
Democratic	Susan Bahren	1,500	37.57	
Working Families	Susan Bahren	130	3.26	
Total	Susan Bahren	1,630	40.82	
Conservative	Orlando Perez	337	8.44	

2021 Orange County Legislature District 11 election
Party	Candidate	Votes	%	±%
Republican	Kathy Stegenga	2,119	56.12	
Conservative	Kathy Stegenga	484	12.82	
Total	Kathy Stegenga (incumbent)	2,603	68.94	
Democratic	Ryan Mayo	1,170	30.99	

2021 Orange County Legislature District 12 election
Party	Candidate	Votes	%	±%
Republican	Kevin Hines	2,003	42.47	
Conservative	Kevin Hines	490	10.39	
Total	Kevin Hines (incumbent)	2,493	52.86	
Democratic	Matthew Rettig	2,002	42.45	
Working Families	Matthew Rettig	219	4.64	
Total	Matthew Rettig	2,221	47.09	

2021 Orange County Legislature District 13 election
Party	Candidate	Votes	%	±%
Republican	Thomas Faggione	1,813	60.41	
Conservative	Thomas Faggione	441	14.70	
Total	Thomas Faggione (incumbent)	2,254	75.11	
Democratic	Seth Goldman	744	24.79	

2021 Orange County Legislature District 14 election
Party	Candidate	Votes	%	±%
Democratic	Laurie Tautel	866	43.28	
Working Families	Laurie Tautel	138	6.90	
Total	Laurie Tautel (incumbent)	1,004	50.17	
Republican	Jennifer Gargiulo	813	40.63	
Conservative	Jennifer Gargiulo	184	9.20	
Total	Jennifer Gargiulo	997	49.83	

2021 Orange County Legislature District 15 election
Party	Candidate	Votes	%	±%
Republican	Joseph Minuta	1,422	45.13	
Conservative	Joseph Minuta	250	7.93	
Total	Joseph Minuta (incumbent)	1,672	53.06	
Democratic	Neil Fernandez	1,405	44.59	
United 4NW	Neil Fernandez	74	2.35	
Total	Neil Fernandez	1,479	46.94	

2021 Orange County Legislature District 16 election
Party	Candidate	Votes	%	±%
Republican	Leigh Benton	1,624	57.49	
Conservative	Leigh Benton	362	12.81	
Total	Leigh Benton (incumbent)	1,986	70.30	
Democratic	Pearl Johnson	836	29.59	

2021 Orange County Legislature District 17 Republican Primary
Party	Candidate	Votes	%	±%
Republican	Mike Anagnostakis (incumbent)	732	72.26	
Republican	Patricia Maher	280	27.64	

2021 Orange County Legislature District 17 election
Party	Candidate	Votes	%	±%
Republican	Mike Anagnostakis	1,275	45.08	
Democratic	Mike Anagnostakis	996	35.22	
Total	Mike Anagnostakis (incumbent)	2,271	80.30	
Conservative	Patricia Maher	555	19.63	

2021 Orange County Legislature District 18 election
Party	Candidate	Votes	%	±%
Republican	Rob Sassi	2,001	56.77	
Conservative	Rob Sassi	456	12.94	
Total	Rob Sassi (incumbent)	2,457	69.70	
Democratic	Gail Jeter	953	27.04	
Working Families	Gail Jeter	115	3.26	
Total	Gail Jeter	1,068	30.30	

2021 Orange County Legislature District 19 election
Party	Candidate	Votes	%	±%
Democratic	Mike Paduch (incumbent)	1,079	99.26	

2021 Orange County Legislature District 20 election
Party	Candidate	Votes	%	±%
Democratic	Joel Sierra	970	67.69	
Middle Pride	Joel Sierra	43	3.00	
Total	Joel Sierra (incumbent)	1,013	70.69	
Conservative	Kevin Gomez	386	26.94	
Ind Leadership	Kevin Gomez	32	2.23	
Total	Kevin Gomez	418	29.17	

2021 Orange County Legislature District 21 election
Party	Candidate	Votes	%	±%
Republican	James O'Donnell	1,941	57.12	
Conservative	James O'Donnell	456	13.42	
Total	James O'Donnell (incumbent)	2,397	70.54	
Democratic	Neal Frishberg	999	29.40	

== Transportation ==
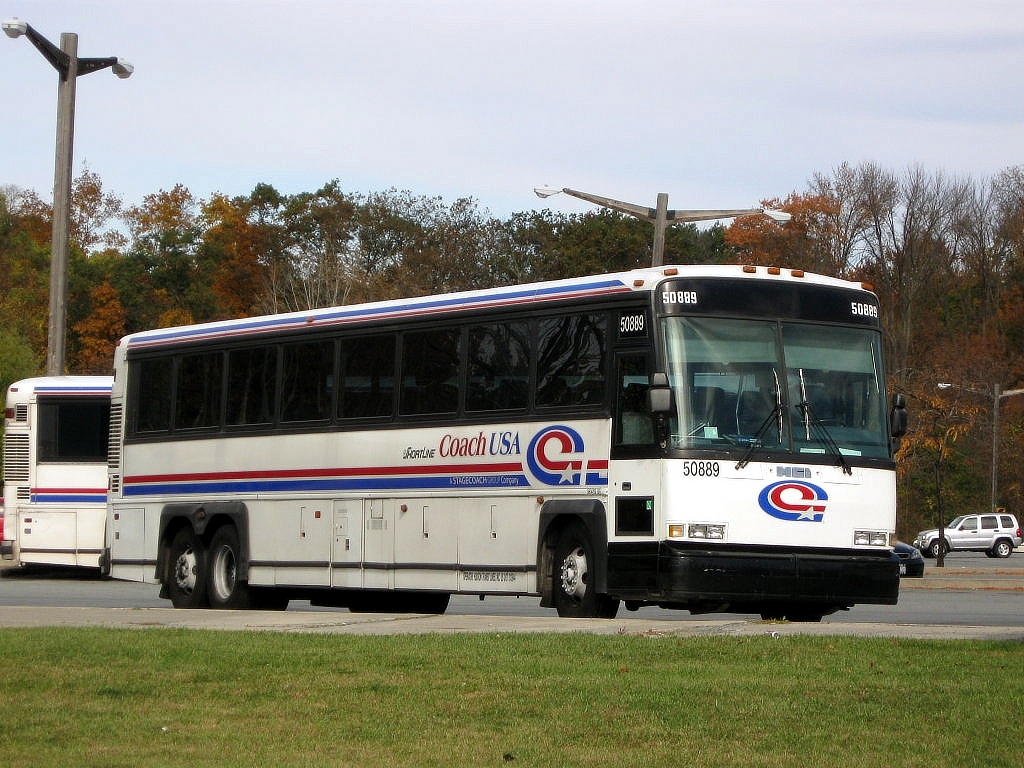
Short Line Bus provides most local and commuter bus service.

The county is served by Stewart International Airport, located two miles west of Newburgh, New York. The airport serves American Airlines, Delta Air Lines, Allegiant Air, and JetBlue Airways. AirTran Airways stopped providing service to the airport in late 2008.

Ground transportation within Orange County is provided primarily by Transit Orange. Leprechaun Lines, Monsey Trails, NJ Transit, Short Line Bus, and Metro-North Railroad's Port Jervis Line also provide services, as well as amenities such as senior citizen & handicapped dial-a-bus and car services, which usually restrict themselves to their respective town or city. Shortline also operates the Main Line of Orange County between Middletown and Monroe Woodbury (Commons), with stops in Walkill & (The Galleria), Goshen, Chester, Monroe & Harriman.

=== Major roadways ===
Major routes in Orange County are freeways Interstate 84, Interstate 87, State Route 17 (Future Interstate 86), and the Palisades Interstate Parkway, and surface roads U.S. Route 6, U.S. Route 9W, and U.S. Route 209. There are two Hudson River crossings in Orange County: the Bear Mountain Bridge and the Newburgh-Beacon Bridge.

- I-84
- I-87 / New York Thruway
- US 6
- US 9W
- US 202
- US 209
- NY 17
- NY 17A
- NY 17K
- NY 17M
- NY 32
- NY 42
- NY 52
- NY 94
- NY 97
- NY 207
- NY 208
- NY 210
- NY 211
- NY 218
- NY 284
- NY 293
- NY 300
- NY 302
- NY 416
- NY 747
- Palisades Parkway

== Politics ==
United States presidential election results for Orange County, New York
Year	Republican / Whig		Democratic		Third party(ies)	
Year	No.	%	No.	%	No.	%
1828	2,586	40.54%	3,793	59.46%	0	0.00%
1832	2,884	40.52%	4,234	59.48%	0	0.00%
1836	2,242	38.77%	3,541	61.23%	0	0.00%
1840	4,371	47.41%	4,845	52.55%	3	0.03%
1844	4,626	46.42%	5,303	53.21%	37	0.37%
1848	4,172	47.54%	3,170	36.12%	1,434	16.34%
1852	4,221	44.86%	5,171	54.96%	17	0.18%
1856	4,274	41.12%	3,948	37.98%	2,172	20.90%
1860	5,898	49.53%	6,011	50.47%	0	0.00%
1864	6,784	50.56%	6,633	49.44%	0	0.00%
1868	8,129	50.78%	7,879	49.22%	0	0.00%
1872	8,471	52.23%	7,712	47.55%	36	0.22%
1876	9,430	48.96%	9,776	50.75%	56	0.29%
1880	10,088	50.65%	9,672	48.56%	156	0.78%
1884	9,968	48.32%	9,841	47.70%	822	3.98%
1888	11,261	49.49%	10,852	47.69%	640	2.81%
1892	11,081	48.70%	10,421	45.80%	1,252	5.50%
1896	14,086	59.52%	8,971	37.91%	610	2.58%
1900	14,137	57.12%	10,180	41.13%	432	1.75%
1904	14,222	56.93%	9,882	39.55%	879	3.52%
1908	14,414	57.03%	9,938	39.32%	924	3.66%
1912	10,364	43.14%	9,404	39.14%	4,258	17.72%
1916	13,619	56.06%	10,198	41.98%	478	1.97%
1920	24,558	66.13%	10,567	28.46%	2,010	5.41%
1924	29,184	67.74%	9,765	22.67%	4,134	9.60%
1928	37,334	64.10%	19,047	32.70%	1,859	3.19%
1932	30,687	56.39%	22,971	42.21%	765	1.41%
1936	34,428	54.41%	27,528	43.50%	1,320	2.09%
1940	38,913	58.35%	27,632	41.43%	145	0.22%
1944	39,041	61.71%	24,059	38.03%	162	0.26%
1948	38,351	62.84%	20,638	33.82%	2,042	3.35%
1952	51,217	71.23%	20,585	28.63%	98	0.14%
1956	57,739	77.54%	16,722	22.46%	0	0.00%
1960	48,646	60.67%	31,471	39.25%	65	0.08%
1964	30,610	38.78%	48,244	61.13%	70	0.09%
1968	44,955	56.09%	28,122	35.09%	7,072	8.82%
1972	63,556	71.00%	25,778	28.80%	181	0.20%
1976	49,685	54.80%	40,362	44.51%	626	0.69%
1980	51,268	56.67%	30,022	33.18%	9,180	10.15%
1984	69,413	67.78%	32,663	31.89%	337	0.33%
1988	65,446	62.44%	38,465	36.70%	899	0.86%
1992	53,493	43.66%	45,946	37.50%	23,081	18.84%
1996	45,956	40.12%	54,995	48.01%	13,587	11.86%
2000	62,852	49.66%	58,170	45.96%	5,535	4.37%
2004	79,089	54.67%	63,394	43.82%	2,190	1.51%
2008	72,042	47.40%	78,326	51.54%	1,614	1.06%
2012	65,367	46.48%	73,315	52.13%	1,946	1.38%
2016	76,645	50.42%	68,278	44.91%	7,098	4.67%
2020	85,068	49.30%	84,955	49.24%	2,516	1.46%
2024	94,936	54.05%	80,253	45.69%	471	0.27%

In recent years, Orange County has emerged as a swing county, mirroring the preferences of the nation as a whole in presidential elections, voting for the winner in every election from 1996 to 2016. The streak ended in 2020, however, as Orange County narrowly voted to re-elect Donald Trump, even as Democratic nominee Joe Biden of Delaware won the election overall. Bill Clinton won Orange County 48% to 40% in 1996. George W. Bush won 50% of the Orange County vote in 2000, and 55% in 2004. Barack Obama carried the county with a 52% vote share four years later and carried the county again in 2012. However, Donald Trump won the county in 2016, thus making it one of 206 counties across the country to vote for Obama twice and then Trump. In 2020, Trump again won Orange County, this time by just 312 votes out of nearly 170,000 votes cast, a margin of about 0.2 percentage points. Despite this, it was only the fourth-closest county in the state and one of five that Trump won by less than 500 votes.

Previously, like most of the Lower Hudson, Orange County had leaned Republican. From 1884 to 1992, a Republican carried Orange County in all but one presidential election. The only time this tradition was broken was in 1964, during Democrat Lyndon Johnson's 44-state landslide. County voters have shown a willingness to sometimes elect Democrats, such as U.S. Rep. John Hall. From 2007 on, when Hall represented the 19th district, which covered most of the county, Orange's representation in Congress was exclusively Democratic, as Maurice Hinchey had represented the towns of Crawford, Montgomery, and Newburgh as well as the city of Newburgh, all of which were in what was then the 22nd district, since 1988.

In the 2010 midterms, Hall was defeated by Nan Hayworth. In 2012, after Hinchey's former 22nd district was eliminated in redistricting following his retirement and all of Orange County was included in the current 18th district. Hayworth was defeated by Democrat Sean Patrick Maloney, a former adviser to President Bill Clinton and the first openly gay person to be elected to Congress from New York. Maloney won a rematch against Hayworth in 2014; in 2016 he was again re-elected over Phil Oliva, and in 2018, despite running in the Democratic primary for New York Attorney General, he won re-election again over James O'Donnell. Maloney was re-elected in 2020, defeating the 2018 Republican nominee for US Senate Chele Farley. Due to redistricting, Maloney left the 18th District and the seat was left vacant. The Democrats nominated former Ulster County Executive and incumbent Congressman from the 19th Congressional District Pat Ryan, while the Republicans chose then-Assemblyman Colin Schmitt. While Ryan won the district as a whole, Schmitt won Orange County itself by 9,652 votes, or approximately 7.94%.

At the state level, Republicans had held onto both State Senate seats until 2018, when John Bonacic retired after 26 years, the 42nd district was then won by Democrat Jen Metzger, for 1 term. In 2020 it returned to the GOP, via Mike Martucci, who chose not to run for re-election in 2022. The 39th State Senate District was held by Democrat James Skoufis from 2016 through 2022, when statewide redistricting moved Skoufis to the newly drawn 42nd district. Skoufis was re-elected to this new district, in 2024, consisting of most of the county. Newburgh and Maybrook, meanwhile, remained in the new 39th District, held since 2022 by Republican Robert Rolison.

Democrats have also made significant gains in the county's State Assembly seats. The 98th district, which includes the far western part of the county as well as the Town of Warwick, is represented by Republican Karl Brabenec, and the 101st district, which includes the Towns of Crawford and Montgomery, was until 2016 held by Claudia Tenney, both Republicans. After Tenney left her seat to run for Congress that year, Brian Miller, another Republican, was elected to replace her. He held the seat until 2022 when redistricting moved him elsewhere, and he was replaced by fellow Republican Brian Maher. Colin Schmitt represented the 99th district until 2022 when it was redrawn and he left to run for Congress, losing to West point graduate Pat Ryan. The 99th district was won by Chris Eachus, a Democrat. The other two districts are also held by Democrats: Aileen Gunther in the 100th district (Middletown) and Jonathan Jacobson in the 104th district (Newburgh). Paula Kay, an attorney and top advisor to Gunther, won the 100th district in 2024 after Gunther's retirement.

== Sports ==
Delano-Hitch Stadium in Newburgh has played host to various professional and amateur baseball teams from various leagues since opening in 1926. The stadium was home to the North Country Baseball League Newburgh Newts for the 1st and only season, 2015.

=== High school sports ===
High schools in Orange County compete in Section 9 of the New York State Public High School Athletic Association along with schools from Dutchess, Ulster, and Sullivan counties.

=== College sports ===
The Army Black Knights of the United States Military Academy in West Point field NCAA Division I teams in 24 different sports. Mount Saint Mary College in Newburgh fields 15 teams in the Eastern College Athletic Conference and the Skyline Conference of NCAA Division III. Orange County Community College Colts in Middletown compete in the National Junior College Athletic Association.

=== Motorsports ===
The Orange County Fair Speedway hosts weekly series racing along with the Super DIRTcar Series along with monster trucks and demolition derbies. They also have a Dirt bike track located outside Turns 3 and 4 of the Speedway. Some notable drivers to race at the track include Stewart Friesen, Brett Hearn and Max McLaughlin.

== Communities ==
=== Cities ===
- Middletown
- Newburgh
- Port Jervis

=== Towns ===
- Blooming Grove
- Chester
- Cornwall
- Crawford
- Deerpark
- Goshen
- Greenville
- Hamptonburgh
- Highlands
- Minisink
- Monroe
- Montgomery
- Mount Hope
- New Windsor
- Newburgh
- Palm Tree
- Tuxedo
- Wallkill
- Warwick
- Wawayanda
- Woodbury

=== Villages ===
- Chester
- Cornwall on Hudson
- Florida
- Goshen (county seat)
- Greenwood Lake
- Harriman
- Highland Falls
- Kiryas Joel
- Maybrook
- Monroe
- Montgomery
- Otisville
- South Blooming Grove
- Tuxedo Park
- Unionville
- Walden
- Warwick
- Washingtonville
- Woodbury

=== Census-designated places ===
- Balmville
- Beaver Dam Lake
- Firthcliffe
- Fort Montgomery
- Gardnertown
- Mechanicstown
- Mountain Lodge Park
- New Windsor
- Orange Lake
- Pine Bush
- Salisbury Mills
- Scotchtown
- Sparrow Bush
- Vails Gate
- Walton Park
- Washington Heights
- West Point

=== Hamlets ===
- Amity
- Arden
- Bellvale
- Bullville
- Carpenter's Point
- Central Valley
- Circleville
- Cuddebackville
- Highland Mills
- Howells
- Huguenot
- Little Britain
- Michigan Corners
- Mountainville
- New Hampton
- Pine Island
- Ridgebury
- Slate Hill
- Sugar Loaf
- Thompson Ridge
- Westbrookville

== Education ==
=== School districts ===
School districts include:

- Chester Union Free School District
- Cornwall Central School District
- Eldred Central School District
- Florida Union Free School District
- Goshen Central School District
- Greenwood Lake Union Free School District
- Haverstraw-Stony Point Central School District (North Rockland)
- Highland Falls Central School District
- Kiryas Joel Village Union Free School District (Palm Tree)
- Marlboro Central School District
- Enlarged City School District of Middletown
- Minisink Valley Central School District
- Monroe-Woodbury Central School District
- Newburgh Enlarged City School District
- Pine Bush Central School District
- Port Jervis City School District
- Suffern Central School District
- Tuxedo Union Free School District
- Valley Central School District (Montgomery)
- Wallkill Central School District
- Warwick Valley Central School District
- Washingtonville Central School District

=== Secondary ===
Private secondary educational institutions:

- John S. Burke Catholic High School (Goshen)
- New York Military Academy (Cornwall-on-Hudson)
- Storm King School (Cornwall)
- United States Military Academy Preparatory School (West Point)

=== Colleges ===
- Fei Tian College (Middletown and Dragon Springs)
- Mount Saint Mary College (Newburgh)
- SUNY Orange/Orange County Community College (Middletown)
- Touro College of Osteopathic Medicine (Middletown)
- United States Military Academy (West Point)

== In popular culture ==
- Heavy: parts of the movie were filmed in the Laurel Grove Cemetery in Port Jervis
- Super Troopers: parts of the movie were filmed in the Newburgh area.
- The Sopranos parts of season 6-b, Episode 1: Warwick and Tuxedo
- Michael Clayton: Moodna Viaduct (Cornwall), South Blooming Grove, and Stewart Airport (New Windsor/Newburgh area)
- The Human Footprint: parts filmed in the Hudson Valley region; aired on National Geographic Channel in 2008
- American Chopper: Montgomery, NY & then Newburgh, NY
- Final Destination & Final Destination 2: Parts of plot takes place in Otisville, NY and Greenwood Lake, NY - Shown by patches that police officers wear and television news program that is played.
- The OA: Partially filmed in Central Valley, NY

== Media ==
=== Newspaper ===
- The Chronicle, Goshen and Chester, twice weekly
- Goshen Independent, Goshen, weekly
- Monroe Photo News, Monroe, weekly
- Times Herald-Record, Middletown, daily
- Warwick Valley Dispatch, Warwick, weekly

=== Radio ===
- WALL, classic pop, Middletown
- WGNY (AM), classic pop, Newburgh
- WJGK, adult alternative music, Newburgh
- WLJP, Christian music, Monroe
- WOSR, public radio, Middletown
- WRCR, music and news/talk, Haverstraw
- WRRV, alternative rock, Middletown
- WTBQ, local news, politics and classic pop, Warwick

== Points of interest ==
Points of interest in Orange County include the United States Military Academy at West Point; OC Gov. Center, a Paul Rudolph Brutalist design in Goshen, NY; Brotherhood Winery in Washingtonville, America's oldest (continuously functioning) winery (as it made legal "sacramental" church wines during Prohibition); the birthplace of William H. Seward in Florida; Museum Village in Monroe, an 18th Century Colonial town; the Harness Racing Museum & Hall of Fame in Goshen; Bull Stone House, a NY Historical designated structure, built in 1722 and still used as a private residence (10 generations) by the Bull family, as well as the William Bull III House, built in the 1780s. The Historical, Art Deco style Paramount Theatre (Middletown, New York), built in 1930. Thrall Library/Middletown station (Erie Railroad), built in 1896, closed in 1983, refurbished (& expanded) into a public library in 1995. The multi-acre, Salesian Seminary, in Goshen, which trained NYC novitiates for the priesthood, was sold to the Village c. 2005 and a $4.5 million state-of-the-art library built on the grounds in 2018.

Three state parks: Goosepond Mountain State Park, Harriman State Park and Sterling Forest State Park. Sugarloaf arts community, which features the Lyceum Center theatre. The Times Herald-Record newspaper, the first cold press offset daily in the country, in Middletown Commercial centers of interest include the Galleria at Crystal Run, in Wallkill; Woodbury Common Premium Outlets in Monroe. The Orange County Fair in Wallkill is an annual 2 or 3 week summer event, dating back to 1808, but officially opening in 1841. Newburgh was the location of Orange County Choppers, 61,000 square foot, $12 million, custom motorcycle-shop facility featured on The Discovery Channel's reality television series American Chopper but it was closed and sold by 2020. The home and birthplace of Velveeta and Liederkranz Cheese is in Monroe (village), while Philadelphia Cream Cheese was invented in Chester.

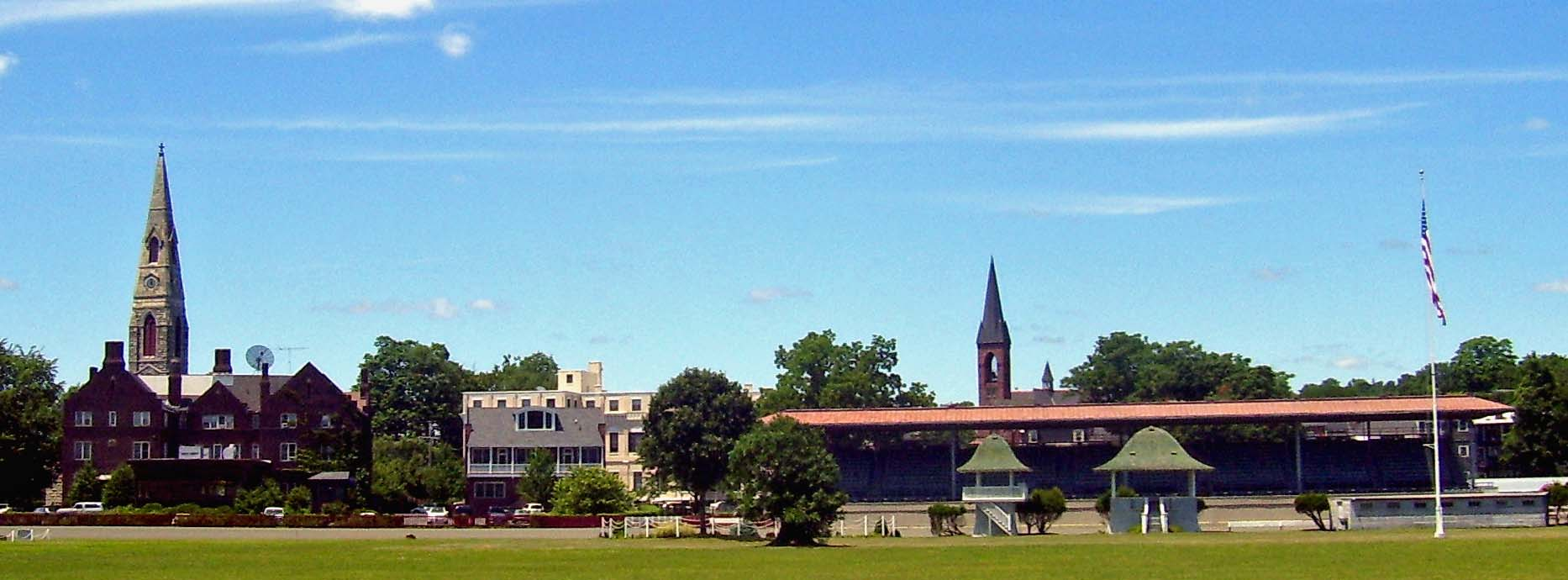
Goshen (Historic Trotter Track)

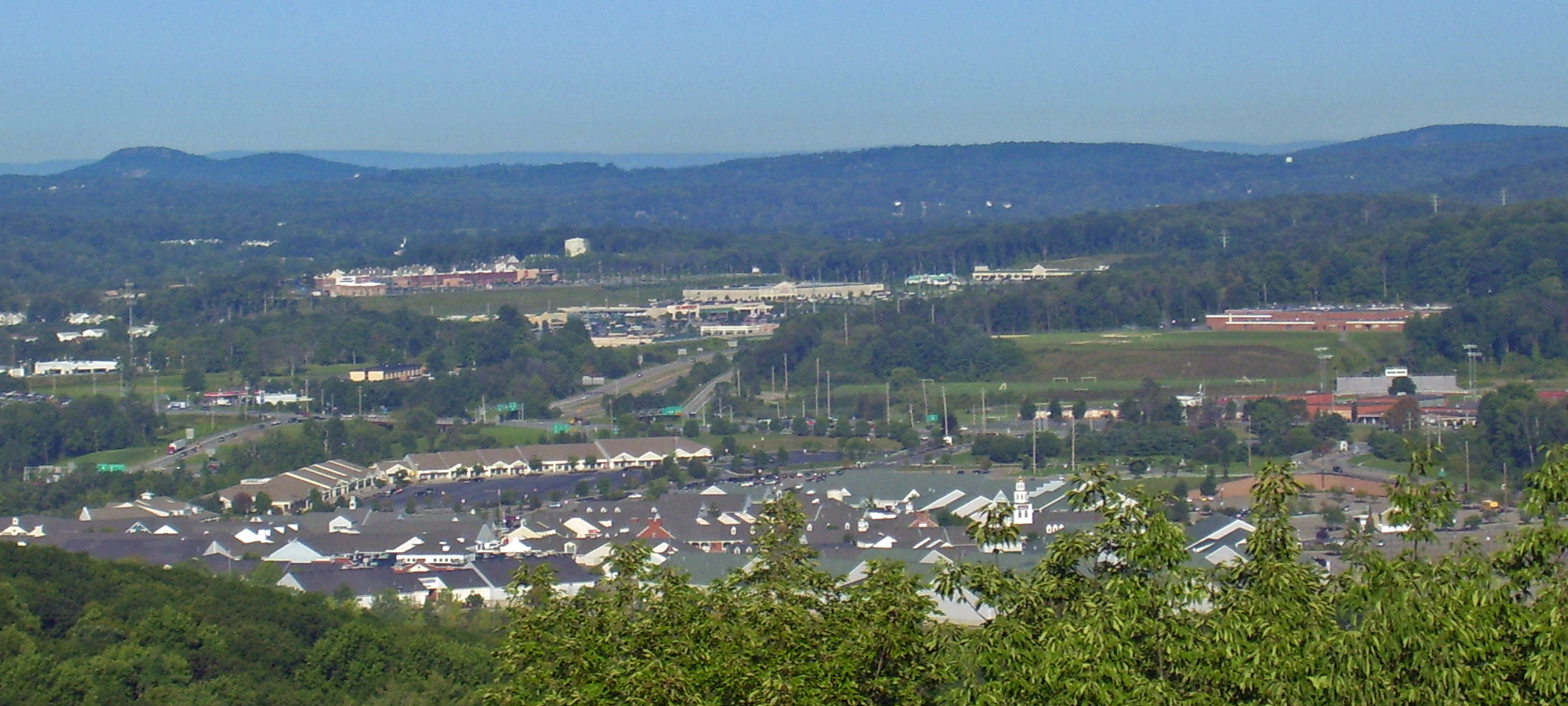
Woodbury Common Premium Outlets

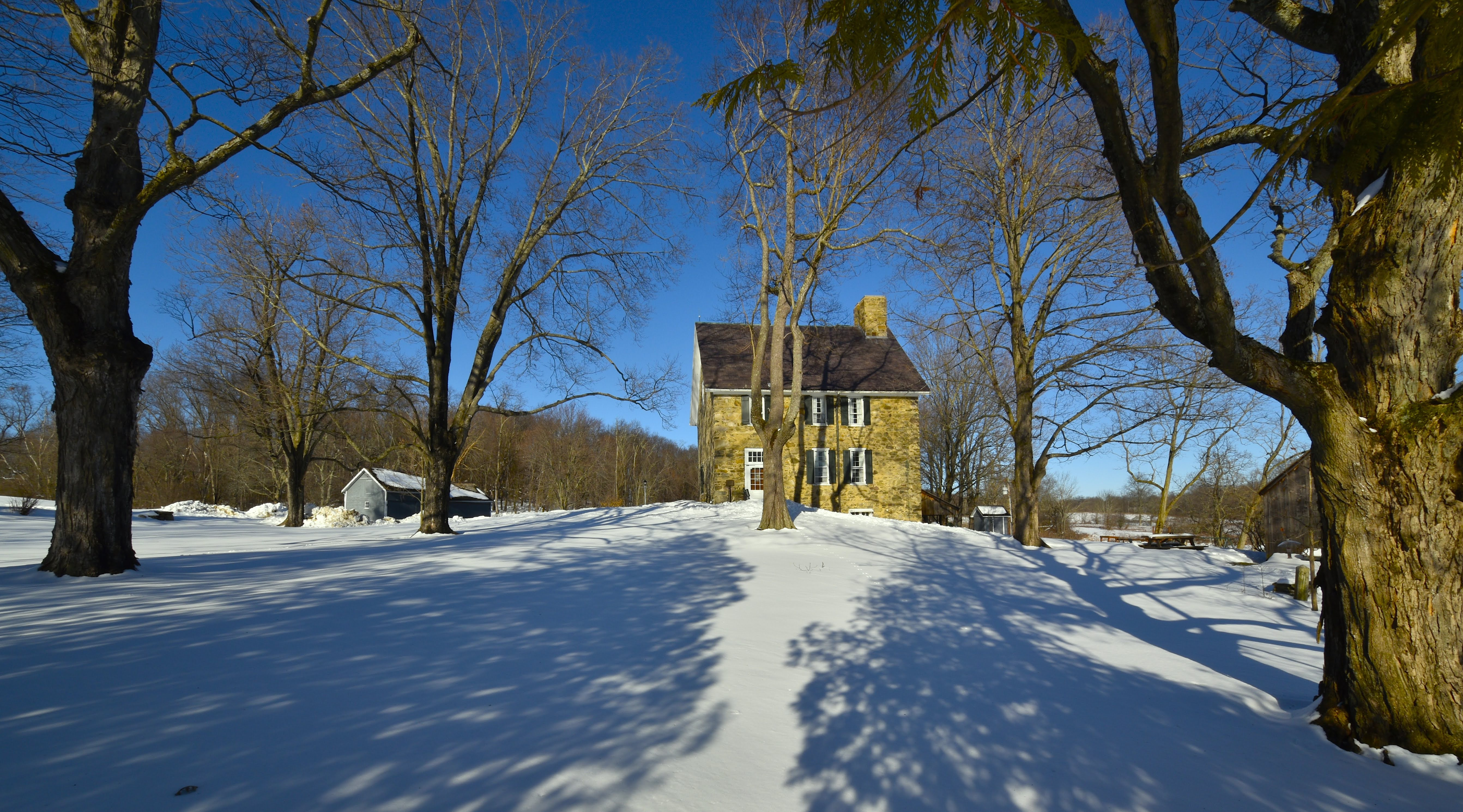
Bull Stone House sits on 100 acres in Hamptonburgh, New York. Built in 1722.

== Notable people ==
- Juan Rodriguez, interpreter and sailor for the Dutch West India Company in what is today Manhattan, from the Captaincy General of Santo Domingo, which is today the Dominican Republic. He began working in Orange County and the surrounding area in 1612. He is considered the first person of African descent and non-Native resident of what would eventually become New York City .
- James Dolson, 17th century beaver pelt trader with Lenape tribes (in Minisink, NY). Namesake of Dolson Avenue.
- Sarah Wells and William Bull, early 18th century pioneer settlers, farmers. Goshen/Chester.
- J. Hector St. John de Crèvecœur Chester Greycourt colonial farmer and agricultural writer Letters from an American Farmer.
- Elizabeth Freeman, "Bett", "Mumbet", Mama Bett, manumitted slave. Her oral "Word of Bett" sheds light on local, Minisink area slavery genealogy.
- Thomas Young, organizer of Boston Tea Party, born New Windsor.
- Henry Wisner, Orange County delegate to the First and Second Continental Congress, (but did not sign the Declaration of Independence) and a gunpowder producer during Revolutionary War.
- David Mathews, Loyalist, Mayor of New York City under the British, during the American Revolution, resided in Mathewsfield (now Blooming Grove).
- Claudius Smith, Loyalist, guerilla Tory who terrorized Monroe with Chief Joseph Brant and the Smith gang, he was hanged.
- Noah Webster, Lexicographer, Webster's dictionary. Founded a private school, c. 1783, catering to wealthy families in Goshen.
- Benedict Arnold, revolutionary war general.
- Solomon Townsend, industrialist and State Legislator, established Augusta Forge (iron works) in Tuxedo Park.
- James Varick, founder AME Zion Church and its 1st bishop, born Newburgh.
- William H. Seward, U.S. Secretary of State, under Lincoln, a 2-term federal Senator and 12th governor of NY, born and raised Florida, NY.
- Albert J. Myer, born Newburgh September 20, 1829. Surgeon & US Army general (1854–1869). Known as the father of the U.S. Army Signal Corps and the U.S. Weather Bureau.
- Moses Stivers, 1 term US congressman, clerk of Orange County 1864–1867, resided in Goshen. Proprietor of the Orange County Press in 1868 and a proprietor/editor of the Middletown Daily Press.
- Stephen Crane, wrote part of The Red Badge of Courage in Port Jervis, ostensibly based on Orange Blossoms battle at Chancellorsville.
- Zane Grey, practiced dentistry in Middletown, before his literary career.
- Pierre Lorillard IV, tobacco magnate, founded Tuxedo Park in 1886.
- Emily Post, author, resided in Emily Post Cottage, buried in St. Mary's, both in Tuxedo Park.
- Tomás Estrada Palma, first President of Cuba, resided in a home on Route 32 in Central Valley
- David Moffat, railroad developer, Washingtonville native.
- Webb Horton, (1826–1908) Narrowsburgh industrial tanner, had Webb Horton House (aka Morrison Hall) built in Middletown (1902–07). The namesake of Webb Horton (Presbyterian) Church (b. 1918 Middletown) and E. Horton Hospital (1929–2011 in Middletown).
- Satella Waterstone, author and composer, born Greenwood Lake 1875.
- Willie "The Lion" Smith, jazz "stride" pianist, born Goshen 1897. A handwritten letter sent by Smith, thanking the Goshen Public Library resides amongst their permanent historical collection.
- Horace Pippin, Black artist and painter, raised and educated (in segregated schools) in Goshen.
- Rose Thompson Hovick, mother of Gypsy Rose Lee and June Havoc.
- Elise McAbee, US Army chemist/materials engineer, born 1920, raised in Orange County.
- Jolie Gabor, mother of Gabor sisters, resided in large brick home with separate enclosed, mosaic-tiled pool, in Goshen, NY on Old Chester Road.
- Fred Gwynne, The Munsters actor, children's author, raised partially in Tuxedo Park.
- Geraldine Ferraro, 1984 U.S. vice-presidential candidate, U.S. Congresswoman, born Newburgh.
- Louis Mills, first elected Orange County Executive (1970-1978). Secured $15 million State Grant to preserve Bannerman Castle from the George Pataki administration in 2000.
- Benjamin Gilman, US Congressman (1973–2003), lifelong Middletown resident.
- Peter Nickles (b. Sept 26, 1938, Middletown) American attorney, served as Attorney General of the District of Columbia from 2008 to 2011.
- John Bonacic, 30-year OC politician, State Assembly then Senate.
- Jimmy Sturr, Irish-American lifelong resident of Florida, NY, 18x Grammy winning, polka band leader.
- Joel Teitelbaum, Grand Rabbi of Satmar Hasidic community, spent final years and is buried in Kiryas Joel
- Aaron Teitelbaum, current Grand Rabbi of Kiryas Joel faction of Satmar Hasidic community.
- Martin Dempsey, US Army General and 18th chairman (Pentagon) Joint Chiefs of Staff 2011–2015, 1970 J.S. Burke graduate.
- General David Petraeus, 1970 Cornwall grad, retired four-star general of the U.S. Army. Former Director of the C.I.A. and commander of U.S. forces in Iraq (2007–2008) and Afghanistan (2011).
- Frank Shorter, Marathon runner: 1972 Olympic gold medalist, 1976 Olympic silver. Raised in Middletown.
- Ed Banach, 1984 Olympic wrestling gold medalist, Port Jervis native.
- Lou Banach, 1984 Olympic wrestling gold medalist, Port Jervis native.
- Bill Bayno, 1980 J.S. Burke grad, 1990s champion UNLV college coach, assistant NBA coach.
- William Moran, a retired United States Navy Admiral and Vice-Chief of Naval Operations (2016–2019).
- James Patterson, prolific (commercial) novelist, born Newburgh 1947.
- Spencer Tunick, photographer of large-scale nudes, born Middletown, 1967.
- Armand Assante, Emmy Award winning actor, raised in and graduated Cornwall.
- Jay Westervelt, environmentalist, Village of Florida resident.
- Andy Grammer, pop musician, born 1983, raised in Chester, graduated Monroe.
- Mel Gibson, attended elementary school in Washingtonville the year before his family moved to Australia in the 1960s.
- Denzel Washington, Oscar winner, actor, attended the now defunct Oakland Military Academy in New Windsor.
- Tony Gilroy, writer, producer, director Washingtonville graduate.
- Whoopi Goldberg & Robert De Niro, Academy Award-winning actors, own homes in Tuxedo Park home.
- Emily DiDonato, fashion model, spokesmodel for Maybelline, born in Goshen, 1991.
- Johnny Brennan, Salisbury Mills resident 1980s and early 90s, comedian and voice actor The Jerky Boys, Family Guy (voices Mort Goldman).
- Nathaniel White, convicted serial killer, Town of Wallkill resident (during 1996 murders).
- James Mangold, screenwriter, director, Washingtonville graduate.
- Cyndi Lauper, 1980s pop singer, spent summers in Tuxedo Park.
- Saul Williams, musician, poet, actor and artist; was born and raised in Newburgh.
- Vérité, (YouTube) pop musician, born and raised in Orange County.
- Cage Kennylz, rapper, raised in Middletown.
- Aaron Tveit, actor and singer, Broadway star, reared in Middletown.
- Paul Teutul Sr., reality TV star of American Chopper, owner Orange County Choppers.
- Paul Teutul Jr., reality TV star and custom motorcycle builder of Paul Jr. Designs.
- Michael Sussman, Harvard educated civil rights lawyer, Orange County resident since 1983, subject of HBO's Show Me a Hero docudrama.
- James Cromwell actor 1970s-2020s, political & environmental activist, Warwick resident since 2000s.
- James Emery, Warwick resident, since 2000s, jazz guitarist of String Trio of New York.
- Shotsie Gorman, 1970s early tattoo artist, poet, painter, sculptor.
- Nick Abruzzese, 2022 US Olympic Hockey Team, Harvard graduate, NHL Toronto Maple Leafs 2019 draftee, Slate Hill resident.
- Derek Jeter, New York Yankees team 'captain' and HoFer, purchased Tiedemann Castle (b. 1915) in Warwick, where his parents resided year-round, sold via auction in December 2022.
- Greg Anthony, former New York Knicks NBA player.
- Cleanthony Early, pro basketball player, Middletown resident, Pine Bush High School.
- Mike Avilés, MLB player, Kansas City Royals and Boston Red Sox, raised in Middletown.
- Matt Morris, former all-star pitcher St. Louis Cardinals and Pittsburgh Pirates, 1990s Valley Central graduate.
- Dee Brown, former Major League Baseball and Nippon Professional Baseball player.
- Jason Motte, former MLB pitcher, closer for the 2011 Champion St. Louis Cardinals, Valley Central graduate.
- Dave Telgheder, former MLB pitcher for the New York Mets and the Oakland Athletics.
- Scott Pioli, NFL executive, former General Manager of the Kansas City Chiefs.
- Stefanie Dolson, 6'9" WNBA center, Gold medal 3x3 basketball 2020 Summer Olympics. Minisink graduate.
- James Skoufis, state senator.

== See also ==
- Hudson Valley
- Wawayanda Patent, 1703 land grant
- Neversink Preserve
- Cuddebackville Dam
- List of counties in New York
- National Register of Historic Places listings in Orange County, New York

== Filmography ==
Orange County, New York, has hosted 27 films and 16 TV Shows since 2018 including Lake George (2025), which utilized the area's scenic settings, and The Whale (2022), with significant scenes filmed in Newburgh. The Pale Blue Eye (2022), a Netflix production starring Christian Bale, also featured locations in New Windsor.

The Hallmark movie One December Night (2021) showcased the towns of Goshen and Newburgh, while Martin Scorsese's The Irishman (2019) included scenes in Tuxedo and Washingtonville. In television, HBO's The White House Plumbers (2023) filmed at the Karpeles Manuscript Library in Newburgh.
