= Steve Neuhaus =

American politician (born 1973)

Stefan M. Neuhaus
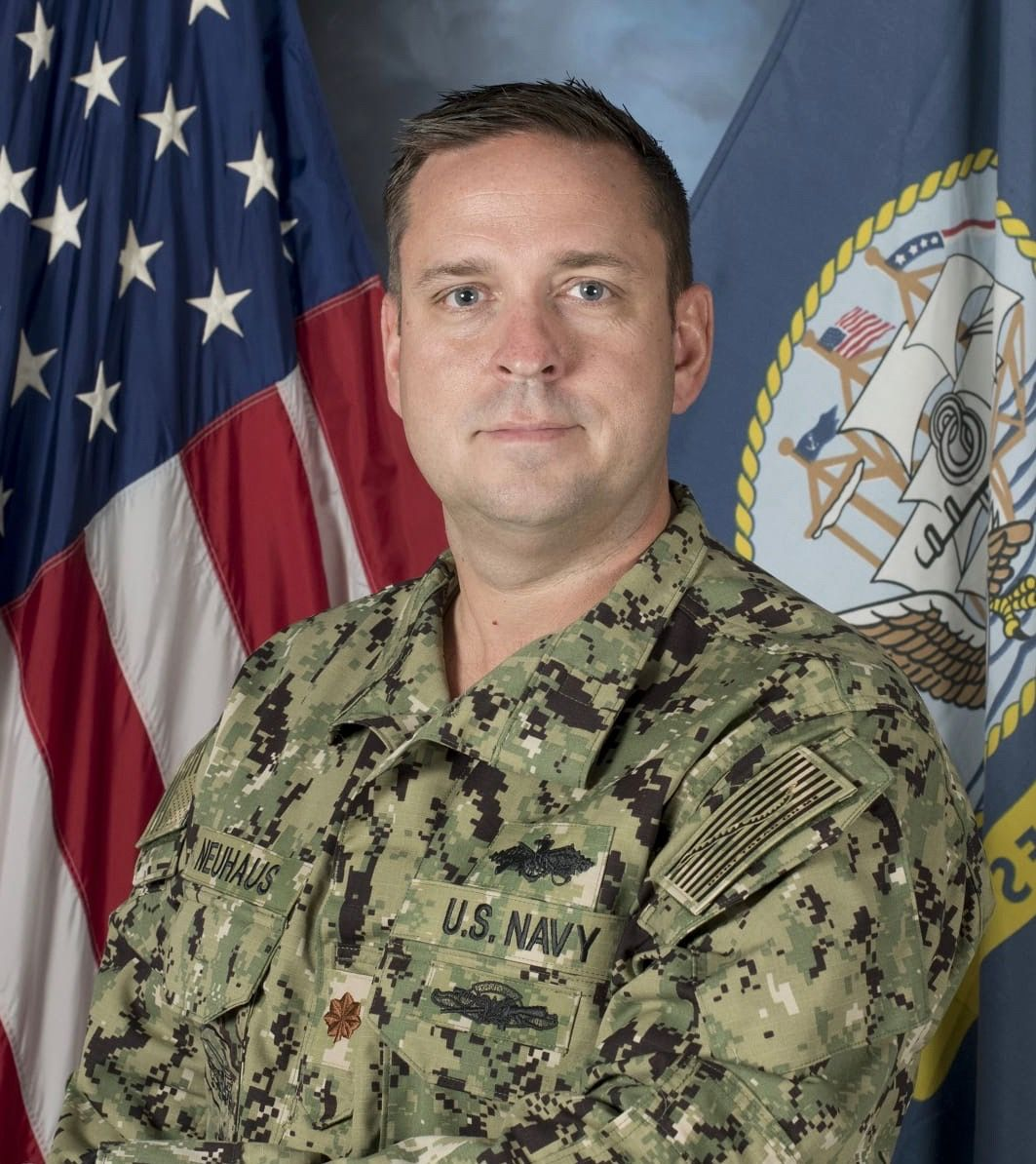

County Executive of Orange County
- Incumbent
- Assumed office January 1, 2014
- Preceded by: Ed Diana

Town of Chester Supervisor
- In office January 1, 2008 – December 31, 2013
- Preceded by: William Tully
- Succeeded by: Alex Jamieson

Personal details
- Born: Stefan Michael Neuhaus; November 15, 1973 (age 52) Monroe, New York, U.S.
- Party: Republican
- Education: Mount Saint Mary College (BA); Marist College (MPA)

Stefan Michael Neuhaus (born November 15, 1973) is an American politician, member of the Republican Party, and the current County Executive of Orange County, New York. When first elected in 2013, Neuhaus was the youngest County Executive in the county's history. He previously served as the Town Supervisor of Chester, New York, from 2007 until 2013. He is also an active member of the United States Navy Reserve and has been deployed internationally four times, two of which were during his time as county executive.

== Education ==
Neuhaus graduated from Monroe-Woodbury High School and simultaneously took courses at SUNY Orange, a nearby community college. He received a BA from Mount Saint Mary College in Newburgh, New York and a Masters in Public Administration from Marist College in Poughkeepsie, New York.

== Military service ==
After the September 11 attacks, Neuhaus enlisted in the Army Guard and later joined the United States Navy Reserve. Currently, Neuhaus is an Officer in the Navy Reserve and assigned to the Pacific Fleet. Neuhaus has been deployed internationally four times, to Africa, South Korea, Iraq and to Europe in response to the Russo-Ukrainian War. His deployments in South Korea and Iraq occurred when he was Orange County Executive. During his deployment in Iraq, Neuhaus gave the "State of the County" address via livestream and continued daily operational control of County government via teleconferencing technology.

During his Iraqi deployment, Neuhaus served with the Combined Joint Special Operations Task Force in various locations throughout the country as part of Operation Inherent Resolve, the U.S. military intervention against ISIS. In preparation for the assignment, Neuhaus was deployed to the Middle East in early-January after completing pre-mobilization training at Fort Bliss in El Paso, Texas in December. When he returned in late-June of 2019, Neuhaus stated that he planned on continuing his focus on economic development and tourism, as well as working to strengthen the County's infrastructure. During the COVID-19 crisis, Neuhaus gave nightly reports to Orange County residents on COVID related issues.

Neuhaus is a supporter of Hudson Valley Honor Flight, where he was a guardian for their first flight to bring World War II veterans to Washington, D.C. to see a new memorial created in their honor. Neuhaus is a founding board member and former chairman of the Families of War Veterans Committee which supports veterans of Iraq and Afghanistan.

== Chester government ==
In 2004, Neuhaus became a Chester, New York Councilman, a position that lasted until 2007. He then ran a successful bid for Chester Town Supervisor, an office he held from 2008 until his election to County Executive. During his tenure as Town Supervisor, Neuhaus focused on economic development.

== County Executive ==
Neuhaus announced his candidacy for County Executive on November 17, 2012 running against Warwick, New York Town Supervisor Michael Sweeton in a Republican Party primary. Sweeton later withdrew from the race, Neuhaus the Republican Party nomination. Neuhaus also had the support of both the Conservative and Independence Parties.

In the general election he ran against Roxanne Donnery from the Democratic party, who also had support from the Had Enough party. Neuhaus won the election with 55% of the vote, with a campaign focusing on economic development, the county's long shut down government center, the county-owned nursing home, and fixing the county's budget.

Neuhaus was re-elected in 2017, defeating Democrat Pat Davis. Neuhaus won with approximately 59.6% of the vote compared to Davis' 40.4%. Neuhaus ran unopposed in 2021.

== Family ==
The son of German immigrants, Neuhaus and his two sisters were raised on a working farm. His father is a dentist in Chester, New York. Neuhaus is divorced from his wife Rachel.
