= Edward A. Diana =

American educator and politician

Ed Diana
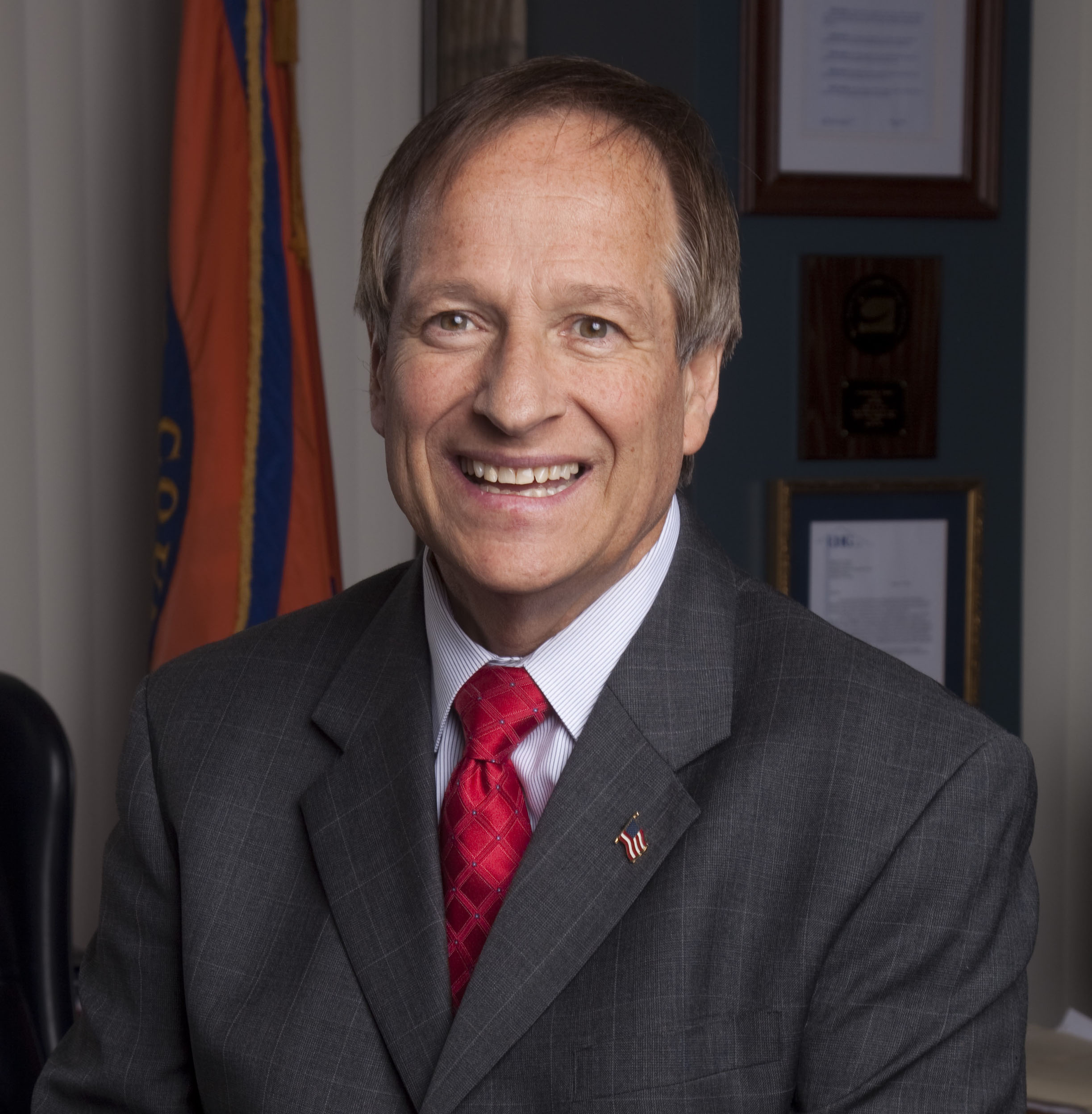

Town of Wallkill Supervisor
- In office January 1, 2018 – December 31, 2019
- Preceded by: Eric Valentin (Acting)
- Succeeded by: Frank DenDanto

County Executive of Orange County
- In office January 1, 2002 – December 31, 2013
- Preceded by: Joseph Rampe
- Succeeded by: Steve Neuhaus

Personal details
- Born: October 23, 1948 (age 78) Middletown, New York, U.S.
- Party: Republican
- Spouse: Mary Diana
- Children: 2
- Education: Southern Connecticut State University (B.S.); Ithaca College (M.Ed.)
- Occupation: Physical education educator

Edward A. Diana is an American educator, politician and former County Executive of Orange County, New York. Prior to being elected County Executive, he served for twelve years as County Legislator. He resides in Wallkill, New York.

== Political career and background ==
Diana was born in Middletown, New York and attended the local schools. He holds a Bachelor of Science Degree from Southern Connecticut State University and a Masters of Education from Ithaca College.

Diana was employed for 30 years as an educator and athletic instructor in the Minisink Valley School District. He was first elected in 1979 to the Wallkill Town Board and served there as a councilman and deputy supervisor until 1985. He was elected as a county legislator for the 18th district (parts of Middletown, Wallkill and Goshen) from 1986 to 1993 and 1998 to 2001. Diana held the position of majority leader for six years. Diana also owned and operated the downtown Middletown restaurant "Diana’s" which was started by grandparents in 1936.

Diana was elected in 2001 by a wide margin to become the fifth County Executive of Orange County, replacing Joseph Rampe of Warwick who was retiring. He was reelected in landslides in 2005 and again in 2009. Due to health issues, Diana announced he would not seek re-election in 2013. He was succeeded by Steve Neuhaus.

On November 7, 2017, he was elected Supervisor of the Town of Wallkill. On November 4, 2019, Diana was defeated by Democratic challenger Frank DenDanto.

=== Higher office aspirations ===
There had been speculation that Diana was being recruited by the National Republican Congressional Committee for a run against freshman incumbent John Hall in New York's 19th congressional district. Representing the second largest county in the district, Diana would have strong name recognition in the area which gave Hall his narrow victory in 2006. In January 2008, Diana officially ruled out a run against Hall, stating he would prefer to seek a third term as County Executive.

For the 2010 election season, Diana expressed interest in pursuing the post of Lieutenant Governor of New York on Rick Lazio's ticket. He has also expressed interest in running in the United States Senate special election in New York, 2010 against incumbent Kirsten Gillibrand.

=== Electoral history ===
Orange County Executive, 2009 – General Election
Party	Candidate	Votes	%	±%
Republican	Ed Diana (I)	35,806	62.0%	Republican hold
Democratic	Pat O'Dwyer	21,949	38.0%	

Orange County Executive, 2005 – General Election
Party	Candidate	Votes	%	±%
Republican	Ed Diana (I)	40,082	61.9%	Republican hold
Democratic	Mike Edelstein	24,656	38.1%	

Orange County Executive, 2001 – General Election
Party	Candidate	Votes	%	±%
Republican	Ed Diana	40,150	61.5%	
Democratic	Michael Sussman	25,147	39.5%	

=== Plea deal in corruption probe ===
On June 21, 2021, Diana pled guilty to charges related to an investigation of corruption on the Orange County Industrial Development Agency Board. State Comptroller Tom DiNapoli and local officials announced the charges against Diana and two others, who were ordered to pay $1.2 million in restitution, in a scheme to defraud the Orange County IDA.

== Notes ==
Preceded by Joseph Rampe	County Executive of Orange County; January 1, 2002 - December 31, 2013	Succeeded by Steve Neuhaus
