= Claudius Smith =

American Revolutionary War Loyalist (1736–1779)

Claudius Smith (1736 – January 22, 1779) was a Loyalist guerrilla leader during the American Revolution. He led a band of irregulars who were known locally as the 'cowboys'.

Claudius was the eldest son of David Smith (1701–1787), a respected tailor, cattleman, miller, constable, clergyman, and finally judge in Brookhaven, New York. His mother was Meriam (Williams) Carle, a daughter of Samuel Williams of Hempstead, New York. David Smith was the son of a Samuel Smith, but the identity of this Samuel is not certain.

== Guerrilla leader ==
During the Revolutionary War, Claudius, along with several members of his family, including three of his four sons (William, Richard, and James), allegedly terrorized the New York countryside in an area formerly known as Smith's Clove (presently Monroe), Orange County, New York, where David Smith and his family had moved about 1741 from Brookhaven.

Accounts differ on Claudius Smith's size and stature. A 1762 French and Indian War muster roll lists him as 5'9". However, a 1778 wanted poster for his arrest claims he stood nearly an unbelievable seven feet tall.

All accounts agree that Claudius was a Loyalist and took part in Tory raids alongside the Mohawk Indian Chief, Joseph Brant. Claudius was also aided in his anti-Whig activities by Fletcher Mathews, brother of David Mathews, the Loyalist Mayor of New York during the Revolution.

Though he gained a fearsome reputation among the Patriots, Claudius is not actually known to have killed anyone. He was even viewed by some as sort of a Robin Hood, helping to defend the Loyalists in the area. At one point, Smith even ended up in jail with a close relative of Capt John Brown (1728–1776), the grandfather of John Brown the abolitionist.

However, when one of Smith's men did apparently rob and kill a Patriot leader, Major Nathaniel Strong, on October 6, 1778, New York Governor George Clinton posted a reward of $1,200 for Smith's arrest. Claudius was soon captured and was hanged on January 22, 1779, in the town of Goshen, Orange County, New York. Two of his sons, William and James (the latter captured in February 1779 by an Abner Thorpe), would suffer the same fate.

Richard Smith remained at large at least through 1781, when his name appears in a letter addressed to Governor Clinton from Gen George Washington warning Clinton that he was the target of a planned kidnapping by the remaining members of the Smith Gang.

== In fiction ==
Richard Smith is a character in Elizabeth Oakes Smith's 1867 novel Bald Eagle; or, The Last of the Ramapaughs, which portrays Claudius's son as seeking vengeance on the people of Orange County for the killing of his father.

Claudius Smith is a character in E.P. Roe's 1876 novel, Near to Nature's Heart. According to Rev. Roe, moments before the real Smith was hanged, he kicked off his shoes, saying, "Mother often said I would die like a trooper's horse with my shoes on; but I will make her a liar."

Author Pam Jackson writes of Claudius Smith's legend in her novel Wood, Fire, and Gold released in 2014.

== Endnotes ==
1. He may have been a Samuel Smith Jr. of Barbados, who is conjectured to have a direct relationship with a David Smith of Long Island, New York who married another Elizabeth Lewis in 1703, and many inhabitants of the New York area at this time traveled back and forth between the West Indies and northern coastal areas. Most genealogists, on the other hand, feel as though David was in fact descended somehow from an Arthur Smith, as is partially "proven" in the manner in which he originally signed his name: with an "A".

== Sources ==
- George Washington Papers at the Library of Congress, 1741-1799, Series 3c Varick Transcripts George Washington to George Clinton, August 10, 1781 (search for "Claudius Smith").
- Samuel W. Eager An Outline History of Orange County (1846-7) pp. 525–528, and 550–565.
- Lost Treasures USA (link now defunct, please write the website owner) Both Eager and this website coaborate the fact of Claudius hiding treasures in the hills of the Ramapo Valley
- Daniel Allen Hearn Legal Executions in New York State: A Comprehensive Reference, 1639–1963 (1997) [concerning the execution of Claudius Smith]
- The 1778 Wanted Poster for Claudius Smith; a possible contrivance
- Elizabeth Oakes (Prince) Smith Beadle's Dime Novels, No. 127 (2 July 1867) pp. 9–14 ["Bald Eagle; or, The Last of the Ramapaughs"]
- Benjamin F. Thompson History of Long Island (1839, 1918 Edition) vol. II, pp. 344–345
- 3rd Annual Report of the State Historian of New York (1897, Appendix "M") p. 712 [Capt Clinton's Muster Roll, Ulster County, 1762]
- Benjamin D. Hicks Records of the Towns of North and South Hempstead, Long Island, NY (1898, vol 3) pp. 179–181 [the January 20, 1728 Quitclaim of David Smith, Tailor]
- New York Genealogical and Biographical Record (1881, vol 12) p. 79 [the marriage of David Smith and Miriam Carle, March 25, 1735]
- Berthold Fernow Calendar of Wills, New York City, 1626–1836 (1896) p. 61, Will No. 260 [The Will of John Carle, 1733: mentions the sons of his diseased son, Jacob, and his wife Miriam]
- New York Genealogical and Biographical Record (1880, vol 11) p. 133 [the marriage of Jacob Carle and Meriam Williams, March 10, 1726]
- New York Genealogical and Biographical Record (1923, vol 54) p. 43 [Miriam Williams born: 17 December 1705 to: Samuel Williams]
- Benjamin D. Hicks Records of the Towns of North and South Hempstead, Long Island, NY (1902, vol 6) p. 159 [Record for the Earmark of Samuel Smith, 1767], p. 168 [Record for the Earmark of James Smith, 1773 – both Samuel and James are listed as "of David"]
- Edward Manning Ruttenber and L. H. Clark History of Orange County, New York (1881) p. 69 [Persons Refusing to Sign the 1775 Pledge of Association (cf. Samuel, Hophni, James, and David)], pp. 71–73 [The Story of Claudius Smith]
- Orange County Genealogical Society Early Orange County Wills (1991) vol II, p. 1 [Abstract of the Will of David Smith (1701–1787) of Smith's Clove, and the Will itself at: Liber A, page 5]
- Joanna McKree Sanders, Barbados Records (1982) [Vols. 1 & 2: "Marriages"]
- North Jersey Highlander (Fall 1968) Issue 12, Vol. IV, No. 3, pp. 3–7 [Claire K. Tholl: "The Career of Claudius Smith"].
- New York Genealogical and Biographical Record (1893, vol 24) p. 184 [St George's Church Records, Hempstead, NY] the marriage of David Smith and Elizabeth Luis in East Hampton NY January 21, 1703.
- Lil Heselton, editor, Will of Hophni [Hoss or Hopkin] Smith, the Brother of Claudius Smith (1826) [Will Book, Liber "H", pp. 103–106 of the Surrogate's Court of Goshen, Orange County, NY. Website currently located at:
- William Nelson Archives of the State of New Jersey (Documents Relating to the Colonial History of New Jersey) (1894, vol XI) p. 84 [ September 20, 1724 advertisement in the American Weekly Mercury relating the escape of the servants: Clodius Smith, aged about 35, and Joseph Wells, aged about 22, from Abraham Porter of Porters Field, Glouster, NJ]
- William Nelson Documents Relating to the Colonial History of New Jersey (1901, vol XXIII) p. 370 [ December 17, 1729 – the Will of Abraham Porter of Portersfield, Gloucester County, New Jersey (Lib. 3, p. 34), proved March 24, 1730]
- William Nelson, Documents relating to the Colonial History of the State of New Jersey (1916, vol XXVIII) p. 564–565 [ July 19, 1773 article in "The New-York Gazette", No. 1125, concerning the apprehension of Claudius Smith.
- Daniel Niles Freeland Chronicles of Monroe in the Olden Times (1898)
