= William Bull III House =

Historic house in New York, United States

- U.S. National Register of Historic Places
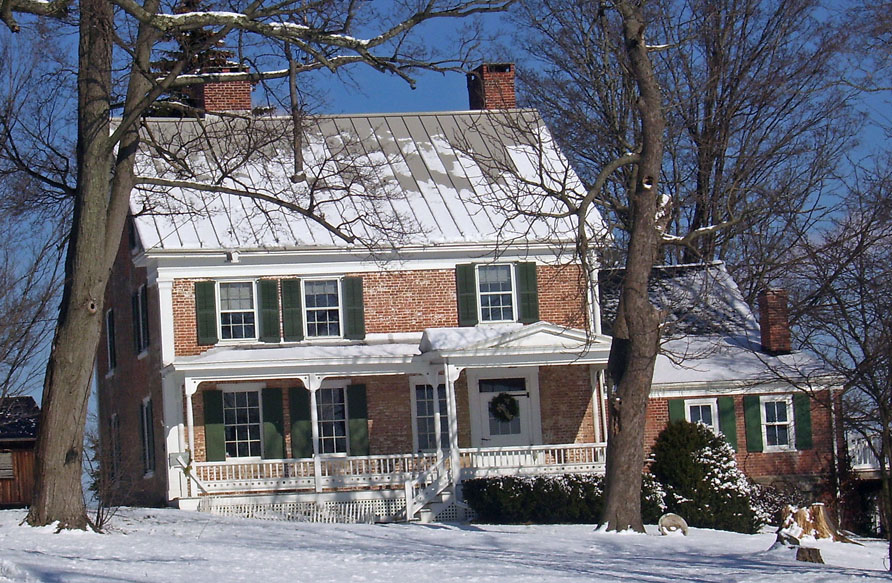
- The Bull House in early 2007

- Location within New York Location within the United States
- Location: Bart Bull Rd., Town of Wallkill, NY
- Nearest city: Middletown
- Coordinates: 41°28′22″N 74°17′11″W
- Area: 113.8 acres (46.1 ha)
- Built: c. 1780
- Architectural style: Greek Revival, Federal
- NRHP reference No.: 86002772
- Added to NRHP: September 25, 1986

The William Bull III House is on a hill overlooking the Wallkill River in the Town of Wallkill in Orange County, New York. It was built by Bull, who was the grandson of early settlers Sarah Wells and William Bull, sometime in the 1780s. William Bull III was a lieutenant in the American Revolution under Col. Oliver Spencer and was at Valley Forge. He received a brevet commission for merit from Lord Sterling after the Battle of Monmouth.

Bull and his son William IV, on returning home in 1781 from serving with Gen. George Washington's campaign against the British, had been impressed with the buildings of Baltimore and other Atlantic seaports visited during his military service.

The name "Brick Castle" is shared among a few early brick homes constructed in the area around the same time. Bull decided upon arriving home to build a brick homestead. Bull's grandfather built many stone houses through the area including Knox Headquarters in Vails Gate in 1756. It is possible that the elder Bull also contributed to construction of is Gen. Washington's headquarters at Newburgh, NY. The Bull Stone House, which the elder Bull began to build in 1722 and took 13 years to complete, still stands today and is owned and occupied by his descendants.

Most of the materials for Bull's Brick Castle were taken from the land around the farm, including the clay. Ostensibly the brick kilns were built on site, but remains have to yet to be recovered. A New York State Historical Register sign on the site states that the building was constructed "for a price of $800.00." This statement has never been verified, nor what construction costs it actually covered. The original homestead was a timber cabin with stone foundations. No portions of the original structure are visible. William Bull's descendants were dairy farmers, and the property was maintained as a dairy farm until 1964. Only one other historic structure, an 1830s carriage house, remains on the property. The other outbuildings were destroyed in by fire in 1964. Six generations of the family have lived there, and it remains a private residence for Bull's descendants today.

It was added to the National Register of Historic Places on September 25, 1986.
