= Elise McAbee =

American engineer

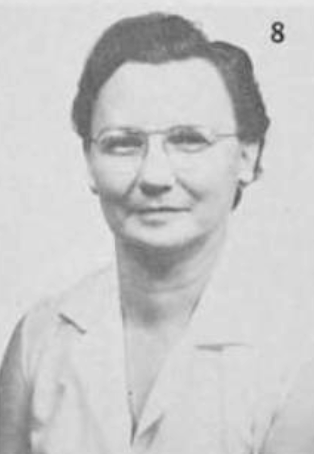
- Elise McAbee, from a 1965 publication of the United States Army
- Born: July 28, 1920; Orange County, New York, US
- Died: May 9, 1991 (aged 70); Bexar, Texas, US
- Other name: Elise Saunders (married name)
- Occupation: Materials engineer

Elise McAbee Saunders (July 28, 1920 – May 9, 1991) was an American materials engineer with the United States Army.

== Early life and education ==
McAbee was from Orange County, New York, the daughter of Daniel Hayes McAbee and Ruth E. Edgecomb McAbee. She earned a degree in chemical engineering at West Virginia University in 1942.

== Career ==
McAbee worked in the Army's Plastics and Packaging Laboratory at Picatinny Arsenal in New Jersey. She and her colleagues won the Army Research & Development Achievement Award in 1965. Her research on plastics, polymers, and adhesives was published in academic journals including The Journal of Adhesion and The Journal of Applied Polymer Science.

== Selected publications ==
- "Use of multiple regression analysis to develop predictive models for failure times of adhesive bonds at constant stress" (1974, with William C. Jones, Raymond F. Wegman, and David W. Levi)
- "Failure of Adhesive Bonds at Constant Strain Rates" (1972, with Michael J. Bodnar, William C. Tanner, and David W. Levi)
- "Application of Superposition Techniques to Thermal Degradation of Epoxide Resins" (1971, with H. T. Lee and David W. Levi)
- "Use of a Reaction Rate Method to Predict Failure Times of Adhesive Bonds at Constant Stress" (1970 with David W. Levi)
- "Relation between the Tensile Modulus of Propellants and the Failure Time" (1970, with David W. Levi)
- "Prediction of Failure Times for Some Adhesive-Bonded Joints" (1970, with William C. Tanner and David W. Levi)
- "Prediction of mechanical properties of polymers. Tensile strength of glass-reinforced plastics" (1969, with David W. Levi)
- "Prediction of Lifetimes of Nylon Samples at Various Stress Levels" (1969, with David W. Levi)
- "Treatment of propellant mechanical property data by reaction rate analysis" (1967, with David W. Levi)
- "Effect of Temperature and Rate of Loading on the Tensile Properties of Glass-Reinforced Polyester" (1964, with Mitchel Chmura)
- "Tensile Properties of Double-Base Propellants" (1962, with Mitchel Chmura)
- "High-Rate Tensile Properties of Plastics" (1961, with Mitchel Chmura)
- "Effect of Testing Rate and Type of Machine on Tensile Properties Data for Plastics" (1958)

== Personal life ==
Elise McAbee married John Everitt Saunders in 1973. She died in 1991, in Bexar County, Texas, aged 70 years.
