= Kevin Mackin =

American academic administrator and Roman Catholic priest (1937/1938–2025)

Kevin Mackin, O.F.M. (April 5, 1938 – November 15, 2025) was an American academic administrator and Roman Catholic priest. He was president of Siena College in Loudonville, New York, from 1996 to 2007.

== Life and career ==
On July 1, 2008, he became president of Mount Saint Mary College, a private, independent, coeducational, four-year liberal arts college, located in Newburgh, New York. Mackin's inauguration as president took place on October 17, 2008. He replaced former president Sr. Anne Sakac, O.P., who had been president since 1976.

In April 2010, Seton Hall University announced that he was one of two finalists for the presidency of Seton Hall. Shortly thereafter, Fr. Mackin withdrew his name from consideration.

Mackin remained as president of Mount Saint Mary College until 2014, describing his decision to step down, in part, to address "health issues."

Mackin died on November 15, 2025, at the age of 87.

== Sources ==
- "Mackin's world travels lead to Newburgh". Albany Times-Union. July 3, 2008.
- "Fr. Mackin ready to build on a strong legacy at The Mount". Mid-Hudson News Network. July 1, 2008. Archived from the original on July 31, 2008.
