= Roxanne Donnery =

American politician (died 2023)

Roxanne Donnery (c. 1943 – January 2, 2023) was an American politician who was a member of the Orange County legislature in Orange County, New York. She represented the 14th District as a member of the Democratic Party, which includes the town of Highlands and most of the town of Woodbury, both located in Orange County. She decided to run against Nancy Calhoun, who has represented the 96th District in the New York State Assembly for 20 years.

== Issues ==
=== Kiryas Joel Pipeline ===
As a Legislator, especially as Chair in 2009, Donnery had been at the forefront of a number of issues affecting Orange County. Most notable was her steadfast opposition to the Kiryas Joel pipeline proposal - in 2004 her legislation jumpstarted the lawsuit against KJ and provided the funding for the county to take them to court over issues in the proposal's environmental review. A state Supreme Court judge had rejected a request by three municipalities to resurrect Orange County's abandoned lawsuit against Kiryas Joel over the village's proposed pipeline to the Catskill Aqueduct.

In a terse decision dated Friday, Justice Francis Nicolai refused to let the Town of Woodbury and villages of Woodbury and Harriman replace the county as plaintiff and reopen the case, declaring that the communities "had every opportunity and did participate" in talks over the pipeline litigation and a related sewer case. (NY judge denies request to revive KJ pipeline suit | recordonline.com) Orange County and Kiryas Joel settled both cases in a joint settlement in February. Woodbury and Harriman officials sought to continue the pipeline lawsuit because they say the county's former concerns about the project's environmental impact are still valid.

After County Executive Eddie Diana dropped the second lawsuit against the pipeline in March 2010, Donnery voiced her opposition to the move, citing unresolved issues with sewer treatment. She was supporting the efforts of three municipalities - Town and Village of Woodbury and Village of Harriman - in their lawsuit against the pipeline that seeks to pick up where the county left off.

=== Inspector General ===
As Chairwoman, Donnery made the creation of an independent watchdog agency - an inspector general to root out waste, fraud, and abuse in county government - a priority. After almost a full year of studying the concept, Donnery pushed for a vote at the end of the 2009 session and successfully persuaded the legislature to pass the measure. County Executive Eddie Diana, however, vetoed the bill shortly thereafter.

=== Valley View Nursing Home ===
The Legislature voted in May 2010 to move forward on studying future options for the ownership and operation of the county-owned Valley View Center for Nursing Care and Rehabilitation. Donnery opposed some legislators' attempts to sell the facility as she claimed that privatizing Valley View would endanger quality of care, price many patients out of the facility, and potentially lead to job cuts. She voted against the study both in committee as well as in the full legislature.

== Death ==
Donnery died of cancer on January 2, 2023, at the age of 79.
