= Bull Stone House =

Historic house in New York, United States

- U.S. National Register of Historic Places
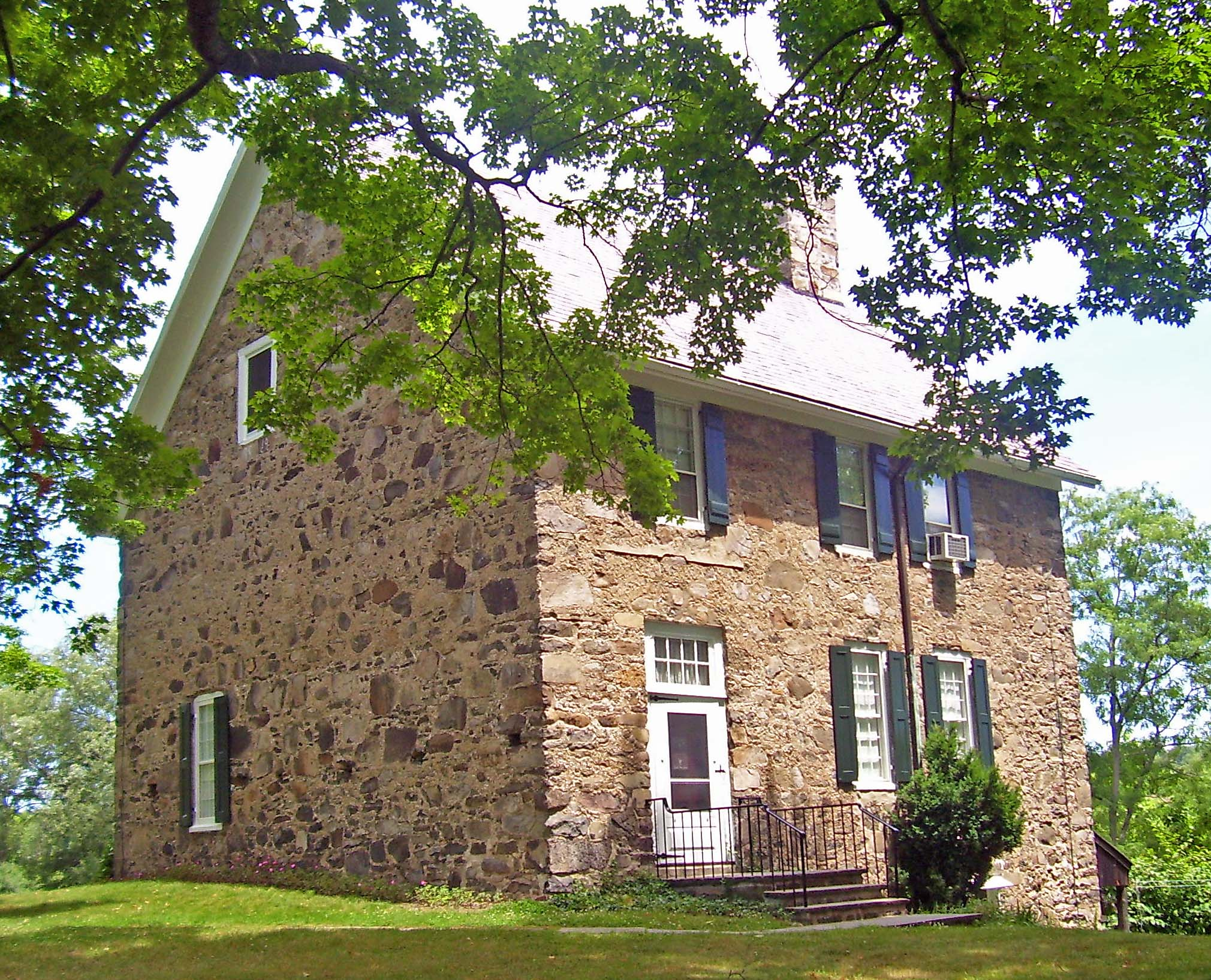
- The Bull Stone House in 2007
- Location: 183 County Route 51, Campbell Hall, NY
- Nearest city: Middletown
- Coordinates: 41°25′51″N 74°15′45″W
- Area: 120 acres (49 ha)
- Built: 1722
- Architect: William Bull and Sarah Wells
- NRHP reference No.: 74001287
- Added to NRHP: July 18, 1974

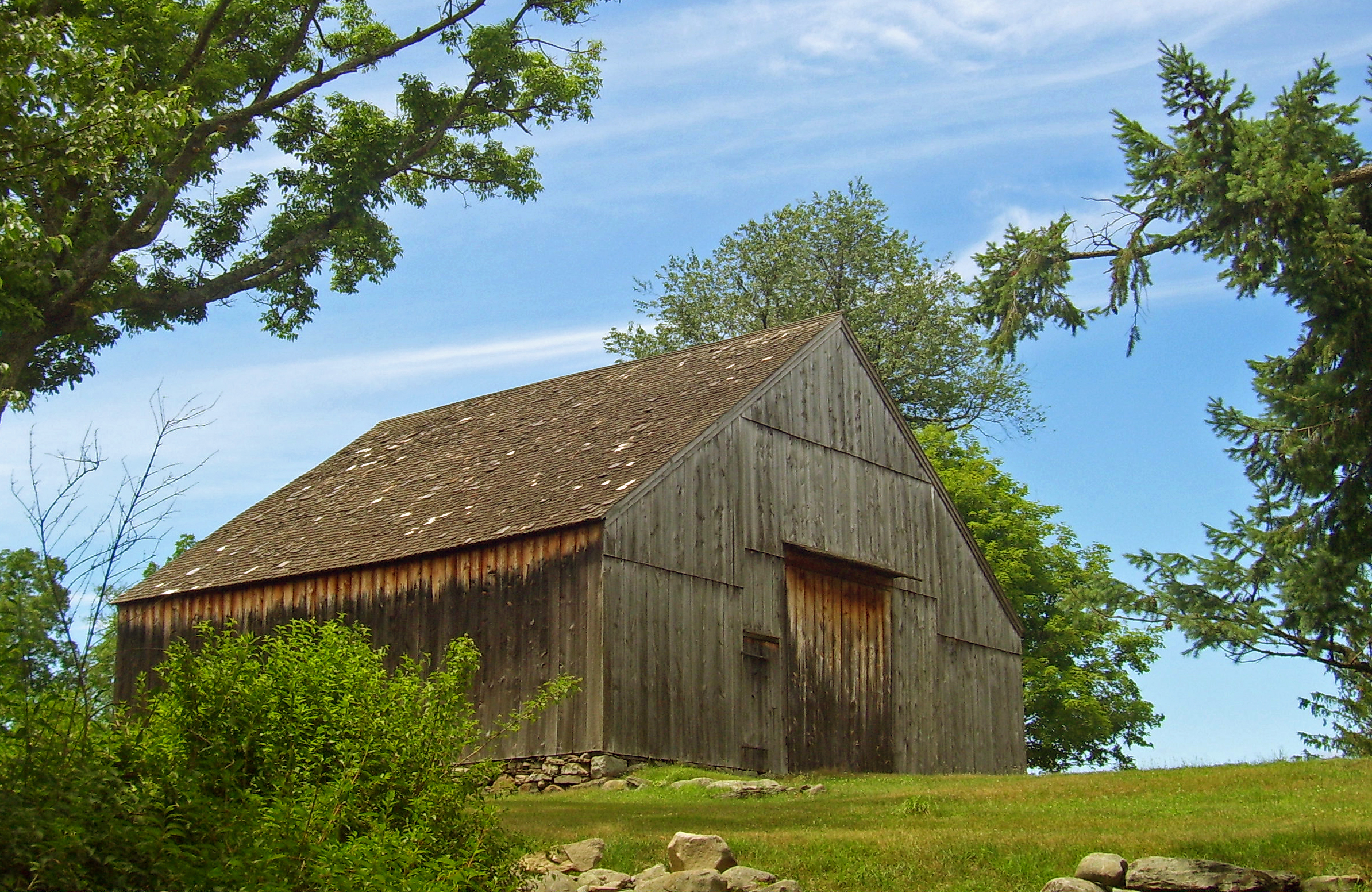
The Dutch barn, is one of only a few hundred surviving in the New World

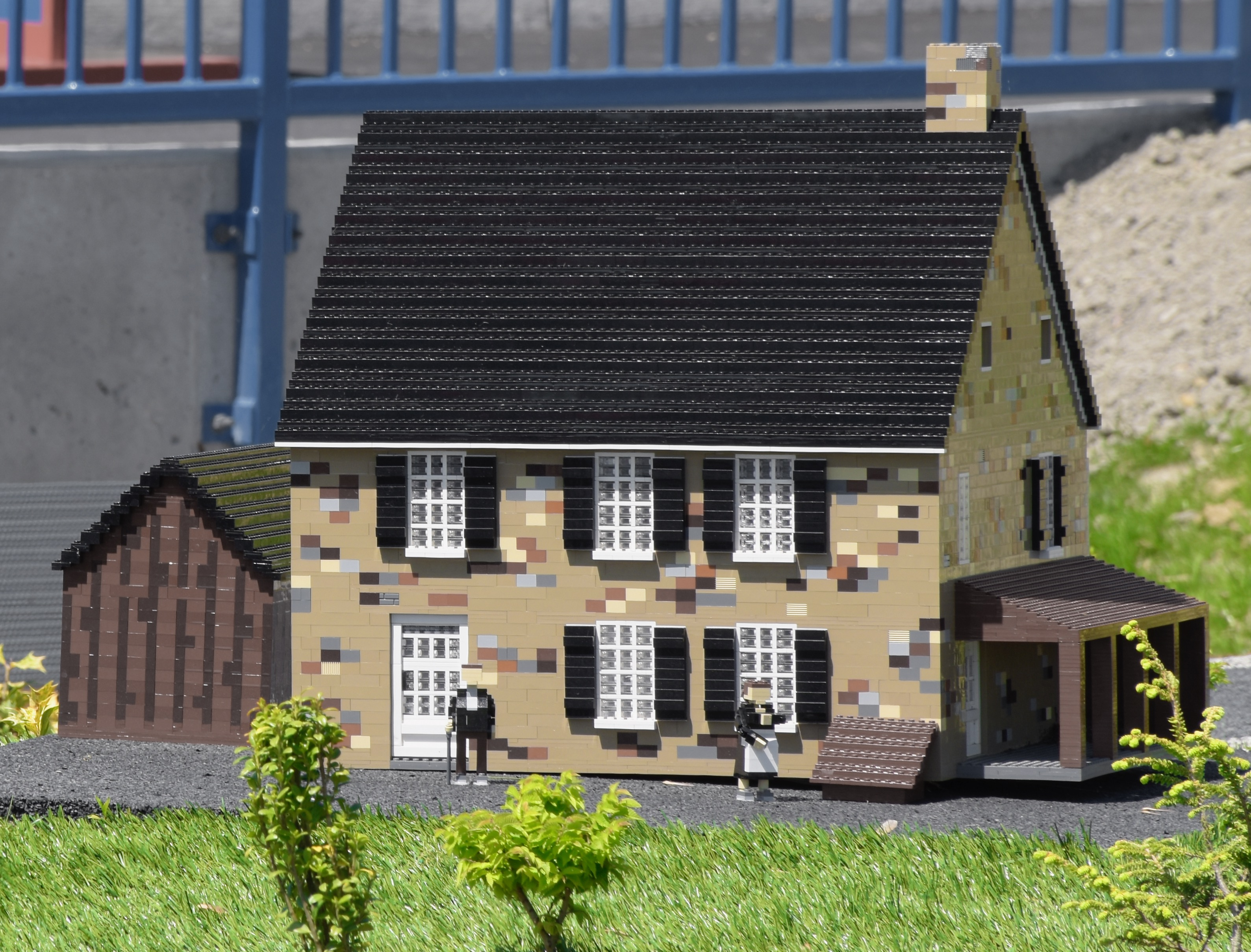
A model of Bull Stone House is an exhibit at LEGOLAND New York MiniLand Goshen.

The Bull Stone House is located in the Town of Hamptonburgh, New York. It is a ten-room stone house built in the 1720s by William Bull and Sarah Wells, pioneer settlers of Central Orange County, NY. It is one of the few homes in America still owned and occupied by the same family. The current resident is a ninth generation descendant of the couple.

Bull, a stonemason, met and married Wells in the Wawayanda Patent (much of the present day towns of Goshen, Hamptonburgh, Minisink, and Warwick) while they were both working for the patent proprietors. Sarah Wells, an orphan, arrived in the area as Goshen's first female settler in 1712. She came there to work as an indentured house servant at the age of sixteen. In 1715 Bull arrived in North America from Wolverhampton, Staffordshire, England and also came to work on the Wawayanda Patent, where they met. He was the hired mason for Daniel Crommelin, a French immigrant and New York City merchant.

Their marriage in 1718, was the first between European settlers in Goshen. Building the house was a joint effort between husband and wife. William bought 100 acres in 1718 adjacent to Christopher Denne's land. Denne was Sarah Wells' master. Eventually, the widow Elizabeth Denne sold 100 acres to William and Sarah's first son, John, when he was just 8 years old. It is family lore that the widow was fulfilling a promise Denne made to Sarah to convince her to act as his land agent in the land claim. The Bull Stone House still stands today and is in the possession of the William Bull and Sarah Wells Stone House Association.

When construction began, Sarah carried some of the stones to the site and William cut and laid them, while they lived in a temporary log cabin. It took thirteen years to complete, surviving a 1727 earthquake in the process. (Other sources place the date of the house's construction as 1722 or 1727). The completed building stands 40 feet square (1,600 sq ft (150 m^{2})) and has walls 2 feet thick.

The house was reportedly used as a safe haven during the seven years of the French and Indian War though no known fighting or battle was waged on the property. Sarah and William raised 12 children to adulthood in the house. Each of the children married and had children of their own.

William built many stone houses around what is now known as Orange County. In the last year of William's life, 1756, he completed a stone house in New Windsor now called Knox Headquarters, which was the headquarters of several American generals during the American Revolution.

Their descendants dispersed within the adjacent region, with the houses of Thomas (now a county museum) and William III also on the National Register of Historic Places. The family has lent its name to the hamlet of Bullville and Thomas Bull Memorial Park.

Sarah Wells survived William Bull, who died in 1755–56. She remarried Johannes Miller sometime between 1756 and 1769, but separated from him in 1770. She moved back to her Stone House, where she died at the age of 100 years and 15 days, leaving 335 direct descendants. The county government has renamed Orange County Route 8, near the house, to Sarah Wells Trail, in her honor. The local Girl Scouts council was named for her as well.

Both Sarah and William are buried on the property next to Hamptonburgh Cemetery on Sarah Wells Trail.

The house and surrounding property have remained in the Bull family's ownership. In 1920 the family incorporated as an association of descendants. Today a ninth-generation descendant lives at the house as the resident family caretaker. Tours are available for the general public for a small fee. Descendants from all over the United States have returned to the house every year since 1868 for a family reunion. The house has been listed in the National Register of Historic Places since 1974.

The 120-acre (49 ha) William Bull and Sarah Wells homestead boasts another historical structure of significance, a New World Dutch barn.
