= Mount Saint Mary College (New York) =

Liberal arts college in Newburgh, New York, U.S.

Coordinates: 41°30′42″N 74°00′47″W

- Other names: "The Mount", "MSMC"
- Motto: Doce Me Veritatem
- Motto in English: Teach Me the Truth
- Type: Private university
- Established: 1959; 67 years ago
- Religious affiliation: Catholic
- Academic affiliations: MSA; ACCU; CIC; NAICU
- President: Robert Gervasi
- Academic staff: 63 FT/ 109 PT (2024)
- Students: 2,491 (2024)
- Undergraduates: 2,141 (2024)
- Postgraduates: 350
- Location: Newburgh, New York, U.S.
- Campus: 70 acres (28 ha); Suburban
- Colors: (Blue and white)
- Sporting affiliations: NCAA Division III – Skyline Conference
- Mascot: Knights
- Website: msmc.edu

Mount Saint Mary College is a private Catholic university in Newburgh, New York, United States. It was founded in 1959 by the Dominican Sisters.

The campus overlooks the Hudson River and is located roughly halfway between New York City and Albany. Roughly 2,500 students are enrolled in over 50 undergraduate and three graduate programs. The Knights compete in NCAA Division III athletics in the Skyline Conference.

== History ==
=== Academy and Normal School (1883–1958) ===
In 1853, a group of four German-speaking sisters of St. Dominic left their convent of the Holy Cross in Regensburg, Germany and arrived in New York City. They opened a school on Second Street in lower Manhattan. In 1883, at the request of the pastor of St. Mary's Church in Newburgh, a small group of sisters from the Second Street Convent opened Mount Saint Mary Academy off Gidney Avenue in Newburgh.

Over time, they outgrew the existing facilities on their property and were looking to expand. Neighboring the original Gidney Avenue campus was A. Gerald Hull's Villa, built in the 1840s. In 1853, S. R. Van Duzer, a wealthy wholesale drug company owner, moved into the villa. VanDuzer changed the name from Hull's Villa to Rozenhof. VanDuzer died in 1903 and his wife died six months later. The property remained in the family until the 1913 death of the VanDuzer's daughter, Katherine VanDuzer Burton. Although the family was offered a large sum of money for the property by the proprietors of a tuberculosis sanatorium, the VanDuzers instead turned to their neighbors, the Dominican sisters. Even though their offer of $65,000 was less than half of what the VanDuzers had been offered by the sanitarium bidders, Rozenhof, the carriage house, the ice house, and a hothouse were sold to the sisters,

In the early years of the college, this Victorian building was the entire college - classes, residence hall, offices, and library. Today the Villa houses the Admissions office, Community Relations, Marketing, the President's office, and the Vice President of Academic Affairs office.

The new academy, called Greater Mount Saint Mary, opened in 1927 and served as a high school. A storehouse was rebuilt as the Casa San Jose and served as the elementary school.

Because the Dominican Sisters were involved in education in Newburgh and throughout the New York-New Jersey area, even as far away as Puerto Rico, the demand for a teacher training program was evident. The New York State Education Department certified the Mount Saint Mary Normal and Training School in 1930. In 1934, the state's commissioner of education granted full approval to the program and the Mount received the authority to issue teacher's certificates after the three-year program. In January 1955, the Board of Regents of the University of the State of New York granted the Mount a provisional charter to grant the degree of Associate in Arts upon the completion of the registered three-year curriculum.

=== College (1959–present) ===
The New York Board of Regents voted to amend the college's charter on October 30, 1959, allowing the Mount to become a four-year liberal arts college. It opened its door to the first class of laywomen in 1960. In June 1962, the Mount granted its first bachelor's degree, a Bachelor of Science in Education. According to the college, both Leon Vincent Short, the first president, and Mary Vincent Ralph, the first Academic Dean, are considered to be the co-founders of the college.

In 1963, Aquinas Hall, named after Saint Thomas Aquinas, opened. This three-story building became the centerpiece of the college's academic life. Guzman Hall opened the same year. It was initially the residence hall for the young Dominican novices. The first graduating class in 1964 consisted of 32 graduates. That same year, a two-year nursing program was started by the college; a four-year program was added in 1971.

In May 1968, the college received full accreditation from the Middle States Association and in the spring of that year the first and only male student began taking classes at the newly co-ed Mount Saint Mary College. In 1970, 58 male students were enrolled at the college.

In 1984, the college's first master's degree program was introduced, leading to a Master of Science in Special Education.

In February 2016, faculty acted on "longstanding concerns about academic freedom and shared governance under its current administration" by voting no confidence in the chair of the institution's board of trustees. President Anne Carson Daly left the Mount the following month and James Raimo, Vice President for Facilities and Operations, took the helm as acting president until August.

=== Presidents ===
1. Leo Vincent Short (1960–1964)
2. Mary Francis McDonald (1964–1972)
3. William T. O'Hara (1972–1976)
4. Anne Sakac (1976–2008)
5. Kevin Mackin (2008–2014)
6. Anne Carson Daly (2014–2016); James Raimo (2016; acting); David A. Kennett (2016–2018, interim)
7. Jason N. Adsit (2018–2023); Gregoire Fluet (2023–2024, interim)
8. Robert Gervasi (2024–present)

== Academics ==
Mount Saint Mary College offers approximately 30 undergraduate majors. It also offers graduate degree programs in education, nursing and a Masters of Business Administration. It is accredited by the Middle States Commission on Higher Education but as of 2026 has a non-compliance warning related to planning, resources, and institutional improvement. It is organized into three schools: The School of Arts, Sciences, and Education, the School of Business, and the School of Nursing.

In 2026, the student-faculty ratio at Mount St. Mary College is 12:1 and the four year graduation rate was 40%. The five most popular majors at Mount Saint Mary College are:

1. Health professions and related programs
2. Business, management, marketing, and related support services
3. Social Sciences
4. Psychology
5. Parks, Recreation, Leisure, Fitness, and Kinesiology

== Campus ==
=== Academic buildings ===
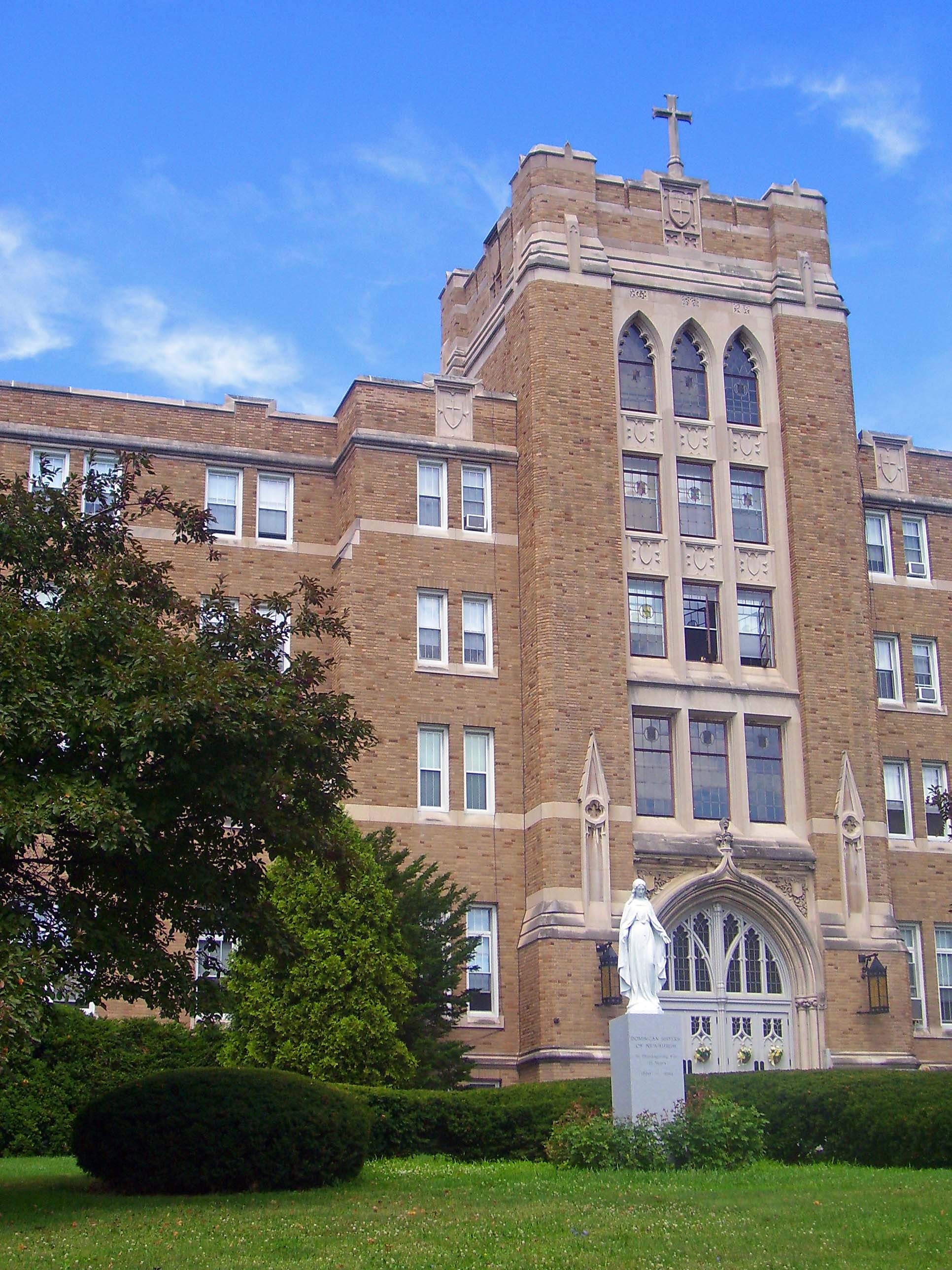
College building in 2007

The campus is set on 44 acres (180,000 m^{2}) overlooking the Hudson River. Its buildings range from a 19th-century home and carriage house to a modern technology center and new or renovated residence halls.

Mount's main campus building is Aquinas Hall and the Kaplan Family Mathematics, Science & Technology Center (MST). The MST Center has a Nursing Learning Resource Center, science and technology classrooms, labs, and a glass atrium. There are "smart classrooms" and large lecture halls, a media lab, the Campus Technology Center, and the Curtin Memorial Library. The Mount's newest dining commons, "The View," opened in Fall 2010.

Hudson Hall is home to the Education Division, Residence Life, Student Activities, the HEOP office, Campus Ministry, and Security & Safety. This building also houses an auditorium, ten "smart" classrooms, the Knight Radio station, and an art gallery. Henry's Courtside Café offers meals, snacks, fruit, vegetables, juices, and coffee. Before being purchased by Mount Saint Mary in 1996, it was the home of Newburgh's Jewish Community Center. Prior to the JCC, the site had been the location of the Thomas Powell mansion.

The William and Elaine Kaplan Recreation Center is home to the Knights Division III basketball, volleyball, and swimming teams. There are all-season turf athletic fields across from Hudson Hall for soccer, lacrosse, and softball action. There is also an NCAA-regulation basketball court. The competition-sized pool, indoor running track, weight training/exercise, aerobic exercise rooms, and game rooms are also available to all students.

Whittaker Hall was the carriage house on the original estate.

Dominican Center, built in 1927, was the motherhouse for the Dominican Sisters of Newburgh until the college purchased the facility in 2011. In January 2014, the renovated building opened to the campus and houses the Kaplan Family Library and Learning Center, a cafe, the Chapel of the Most Holy Rosary, and three floors of dormitories.

=== Residence halls ===
Besides the dorms in the Dominican Center, several other dormitories are on campus.

Sakac Hall is a freshman co-ed residence hall. Each floor has a lounge area with a bathroom and study area. Additional amenities in the building include a movie theater room, laundry room, computer room, vending machines, fitness room, and a fully equipped kitchen.

Guzman Hall was a freshman male residence hall. The building contained multiple student lounges. During the Covid-19 pandemic, Guzman Hall was used as an illness center. Freshman male students have since then resided in Sakac Hall. In 2021, Guzman Hall was renovated to become the Desmond Center for Community Engagement and Wellness.

The College Courts are townhouse-style upperclassmen residences. There are lounges in each building and at least one full kitchen.

== Student life ==
=== Student government ===
The Student Government Association is the legislative body for student life. It can recommend policy changes to the Vice President for Student Affairs and the president of Mount Saint Mary College. The Director of Student Activities advises the Student Government Association. Student representatives sit on major faculty committees and participate in ad hoc committees formed annually. Mount Saint Mary's Commuter Council represents commuter students on campus, while the Resident Living Council represents students on campus. Student Government works with the Director of Student Activities to plan and implement activities such as film screenings, trips, plays, parties, dinner dances, coffeehouses, lectures, and the yearbook (Thyme).

=== Student activities ===
The Student Activities offices in Hudson Hall are a focal point for Student Activities and events. The center includes the Student Government, Mount Activities Programing, student publications offices, an auditorium, meeting rooms, and lounges.

Mount Saint Mary College offers the MSMC Shuttle Van to transport students to local shopping areas and the Beacon Train Station. The shuttle is available with a Mount identification card on a first-come, first-served basis.

== Athletics ==
Mount Saint Mary athletics wordmark

Mount Saint Mary College is an NCAA Division III school with 21 competing teams. MSMC participates in the Eastern College Athletic Conference and the Skyline Conference. These intercollegiate athletics programs include baseball, basketball, women's cheerleading, cross-country, men's golf, lacrosse, soccer, softball, swimming, tennis, indoor/outdoor track and field, and women's volleyball. The institution also sponsors intramural sports year-round.

The Elaine and William Kaplan Recreation Center is the site of many athletic events on campus. The Kaplan Center houses basketball and volleyball courts, a running track, a pool, a weight room, an aerobics room, and training facilities. The men's and women's basketball teams compete inside the Kaplan Center, as do the women's volleyball and the men's and women's swimming teams. Kaplan Field is an all-season turf athletic field located across from Hudson Hall that serves as the site for men's and women's soccer and lacrosse. Next to the turf athletic field are six tennis courts. The Mount also has a baseball/softball field complex next to the Dominican Center.

== Bishop Dunn Memorial School ==
The institution includes a private K-8 school, Bishop Dunn Memorial School, located on the south end of its campus.

Beginning in 2013, Saint Basil Academy sends its elementary and middle school students to be educated at Bishop Dunn Memorial.

== Notable alumni ==
- Thomas Kirwan (1970), Member of the New York State Assembly
- Denise Doring VanBuren (1997 MBA) - 45th president of the Daughters of the American Revolution
- Tyler Tumminia (2000) - Premier Hockey Federation commissioner, baseball executive
- Karl A. Brabenec (2001) - New York State Assembly, District 98
- John F. Amodeo (BA) - Former Member of the New Jersey General Assembly
- Steve Neuhaus (BA) - Orange County Executive
