= Minisink (disambiguation) =

Minisink is a loosely defined region of the Upper Delaware Valley in parts of New Jersey, Pennsylvania, and New York, first settled in the 1690s.

Minisink may also refer to:

- Minisink, New York
  - Minisink Valley Central School District
    - Minisink Valley High School
- Minisink Ford, New York
- Minisink Archeological Site, a Native American site located in Sussex County, New Jersey and Pike County, Pennsylvania
- Battle of Minisink, a 1779 battle in the American Revolutionary War
- Minisink Angle, a colonial land grant in early 18th Century New York
