= Woodlawn Farm (Slate Hill, New York) =

Historic house in New York, United States

- U.S. National Register of Historic Places
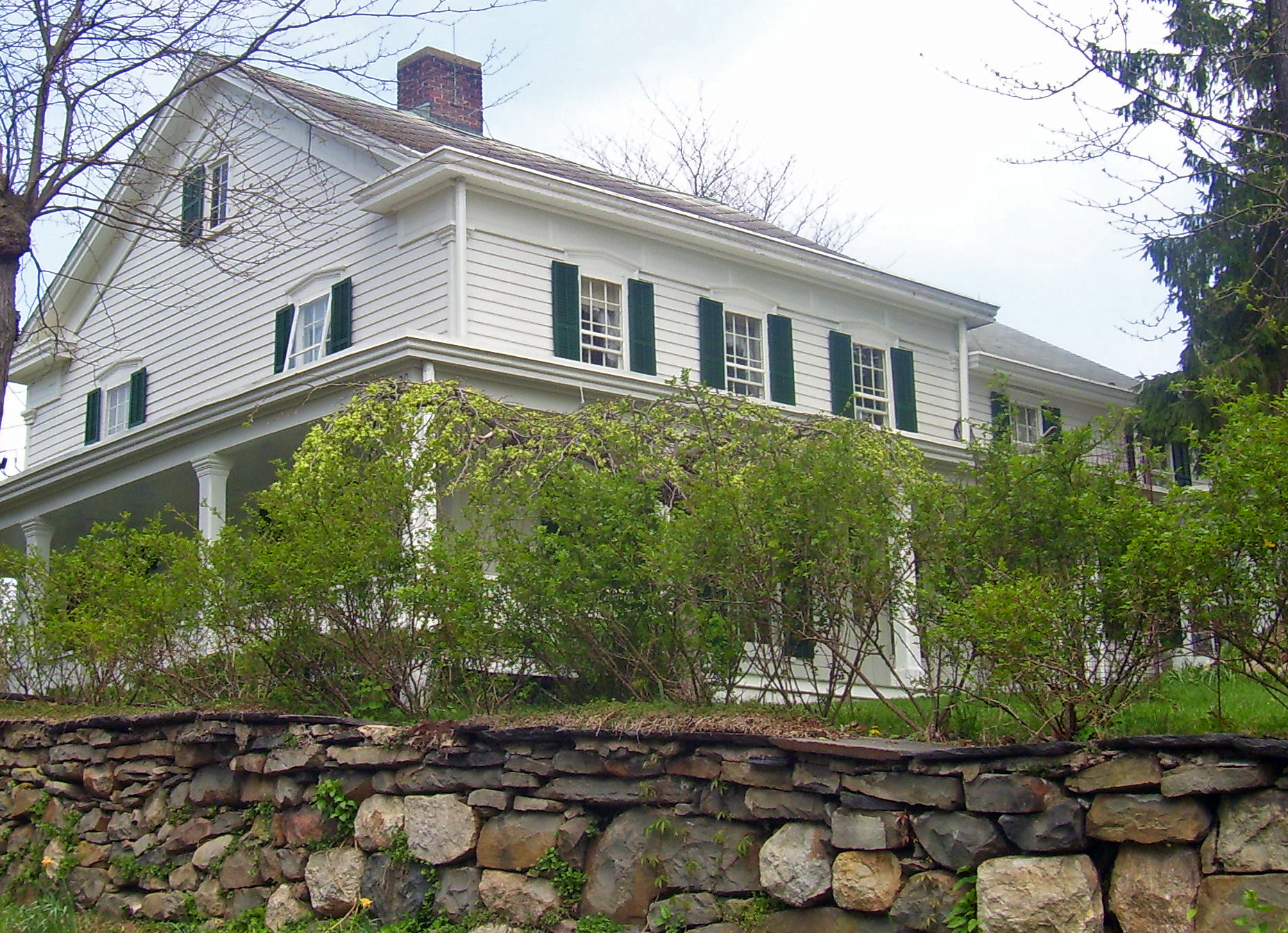
- South (front) elevation and west profile of main block, 2008
- Location: Slate Hill, NY
- Nearest city: Middletown
- Coordinates: 41°23′34″N 74°28′41″W
- Area: 20 acres (8.1 ha)
- Built: ca. 1790
- Architectural style: Federal, Greek Revival, Italianate
- NRHP reference No.: 08000277
- Added to NRHP: April 11, 2008

Woodlawn Farm, sometimes known as the Wood Homestead, is located on Mount Orange Road, a short distance north of Slate Hill, New York, United States. It is centered by a three-section farmhouse whose materials date to the mid-18th century, making it one of the oldest buildings in the Town of Wawayanda. In 2008 it was listed on the National Register of Historic Places.

It has undergone extensive renovation and reconstruction since its original construction, some incorporating elements of architectural styles of the later 19th century. Its residents, many of whom lived in the house for years, have primarily been from two different families, including the descendants of the original builder. Many have also been active in local affairs and served in political office. Woodlawn Farm has thus played an important role in the history of Slate Hill.

== Property ==
The main farmhouse is a combination of three structures erected during different eras. The main (west) block, closest to the road, is a two-and-a-half-story three-by-two-bay gable-roofed clapboard-sided 28-by-25-foot (8.5 by 7.6 m) unit with wraparound veranda on the south and west sides. All the windows have louvered shutters, with those on the main block larger than the other two sections. The roof has patterned cement-asbestos shingles and a brick chimney.

The center and east sections are smaller two-by-two-bay two-story buildings with rolled asphalt roofs, progressively lower in height. Another chimney rises from the east block, currently used as a kitchen. A chimney on the center block has been largely dismantled.

Inside, the main block has a side-hall, double-parlor plan, suggesting it was built as the Federal style was becoming popular in the late 18th century. Some of the decorative touches, such as woodwork and door paneling, are in keeping with the Greek Revival era and an extensive renovation around that time. In the center section, believed to be the oldest, the two open areas and cooking fireplace are consistent with the late 18th century. A library and bay window were added during the 19th century. Its upper story is used for bedrooms.

The east block, the smallest and newest, serves as the kitchen with a large brick mass separating it from the cooking areas in the center block. Its upper story is unfinished.

Two outbuildings are considered contributing resources to the farm's historic character. A large barn with gabled roof is to the north, near the carport, and a frame privy with gabled, asphalt-shingled roof, four-paneled door and novelty siding.

== History ==
Local lore dates the building's center block to 1765, when Benjamin Whitaker owned what was then a 129-acre (52 ha) property but the hand-hewn timbers visible in the basement, and the finishes used are not consistent with that period. They, and the overall plan, are more suggestive of a circa-1790 construction date. Richard Wood, the first known occupant of the house, did not settle it until 1772. His house was used for early meetings of the nearby Primitive Baptist Church of Brookfield until the church that still bears that name was built in 1792. The main block was probably added around this time.

While the house itself may not be as old as believed, some of its materials may. In 2002, during the most recent renovation of the house, notched hand-hewn timbers were found beneath the center-block bathroom floor that are more extensively used in houses on Long Island from that era. They appear to have been reused from a previously built home. No record or other trace exists of any earlier building on or near the site.

From Wood, the house became the property of Festus Webb, a local official, in 1796. He would reside there for the next forty years, during which the Greek Revival aspects of the main block were added. Roswell Mead, who bought it from Webb's estate, lived there until his death in 1850, serving as town supervisor, New York State Assemblyman, and town justice during his residency. His wife and son sold the property to William Wood, Richard's grandson, in 1867.

Like his predecessors, Wood would own the house for over two decades, and distinguish himself in local politics as a supervisor, a position he held for 14 years. It is likely that he put the east wing on the house, due to the Italianate touches on it. He built the current barn in 1888 when the original one burned down. He also branched out from farming into industry, damming a nearby stream to create the now-drained Crescent Lake. He built a gristmill, ice house and the Springbrook Hat Factory, using wild teasel from his fields to card the wool. None of these buildings remain, but their existence is attested by period photographs.

He transferred the property to his daughter Minnie in 1900. Under her ownership, the property became more valuable as real estate than as farmland. She subdivided it into 18 lots, reducing the family plot to today's 20 acres (8.1 ha) around the house and fronting on the road. Her son LeRoy inherited it when she died in 1945, then sold it to Dr. Frank Myers Jr. a year later.

Myers, who lived at Woodlawn until 1986, was also active in community affairs. He chaired the Department of Medicine at Middletown's Horton Memorial Hospital for 22 years, serving for part of that time as chief of staff, while maintaining his local practice. He was the town's health officer, and also played a part in establishing the Minisink Valley Central School District. His son and daughter-in-law have lived there since then.

== Aesthetics ==
The original blocks of the Woodlawn Farm house are representative of English colonial building traditions of the mid-18th century. The center block's two-by-two-bay shape is common among older houses in Orange County built by settlers of English descent, especially in the Town of Montgomery. Most were expanded with only one wing, or with an additional bay or two. The two separate blocks added on and heavily modified in later eras represent a distinctive record of the changes in architectural taste among the region's prosperous landowners.
