= Primitive Baptist Church of Brookfield =

Historic church in New York, United States

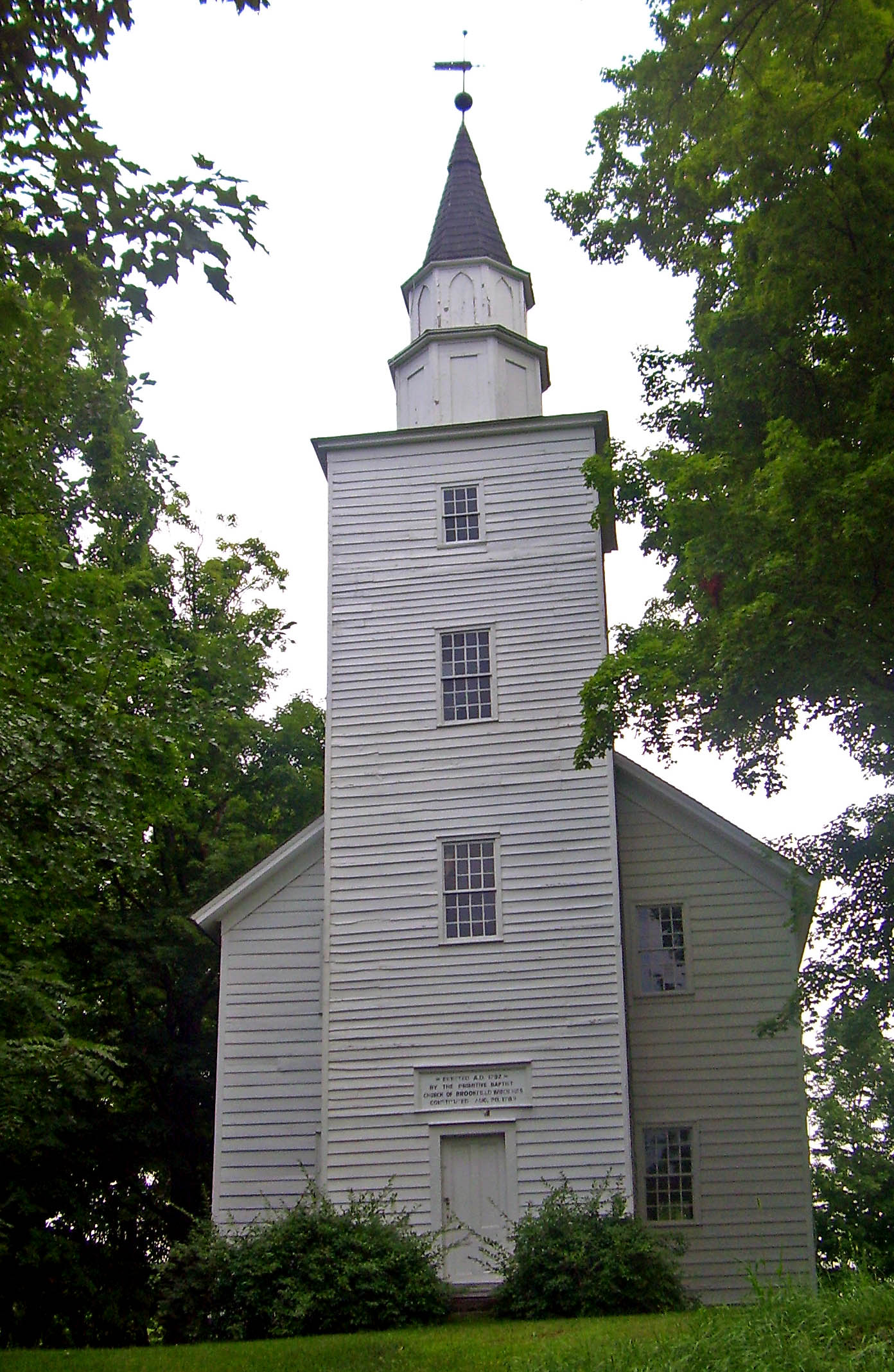
- Front (south) elevation, 2007

Religion
- Affiliation: Primitive Baptist
- Ecclesiastical or organisational status: church
- Year consecrated: 1792
- Status: preserved

Location
- Location: NY 6, Slate Hill, NY, United States
- Interactive map of Primitive Baptist Church of Brookfield
- Coordinates: 41°23′25″N 74°28′26″W

Architecture
- Groundbreaking: 1792
- Completed: 1792

Specifications
- Direction of façade: south
- Materials: wood

U.S. National Register of Historic Places
- Added to NRHP: November 13, 1976
- NRHP Reference no.: 76001260

The Primitive Baptist Church of Brookfield, also known as the Old School Baptist Meeting House, is located along US 6 in Slate Hill, New York, United States, a hamlet of the Town of Wawayanda in Orange County. It was built in 1792, when the settlement was known as Brookfield. It is one of the oldest extant church buildings in the county, and one of the earliest buildings in the settlement that became Slate Hill.

In 1976 it was added to the National Register of Historic Places due to its age and architectural interest as a late example of vernacular building techniques much more common in the early 18th century. Although there were no members of the congregation from 1933 until 2004, local preservationists continued holding an annual service presided over by an Old School Baptist pastor from North Carolina, and in recent years the membership has been repopulated.

== Building ==
Located on a slight rise on the north side of Route 6 just east of the intersection with NY 284 at the center of the hamlet, the church is a tall white two-story clapboard gable-roofed structure. A four-story tower with belfry and spire, added later, stands at the front. The north (rear) and west sides are two bays apiece and still have most of the original sashing on their windows. The east side has three bays, reflecting its onetime status as the church's main entrance, and it still has the classically detailed doorway with sidelights. The cornice's original dentils are still present but difficult to see.

Inside there are box pews typical of the era with raised and fielded panels, a late medieval touch. A hexagonal raised pulpit is mounted against the west wall. A three-sided gallery fills the building's second story; it can be reached via the tower stairs. The entire interior is done in unpainted white pine.

A cemetery with gravestones dating to the era of the church's founding is located to the east. The only outbuilding is a non-historic outhouse because there is no plumbing in the building.

== History ==
The meetings of local Baptists that became the church began in 1783 at nearby Woodlawn Farm, the home of member Richard Wood, an early local settler. Eight years later, in 1791, the church was formally incorporated and the following year another member, Joseph Hallock, gave land for the church to be built. It took the Brookfield name from the growing settlement.

In 1828 the tower was added, with the stairs inside allowing more seating capacity within. Five years later, the church broke with Mainstream Baptists and affiliated itself instead with the Primitive Baptist movement, which the year before had rejected the evangelical directions the denomination was taking in the Second Great Awakening. Believing that eschewing foreign missions and Sunday schools was more in line with early Calvinism, they were also sometimes called the Old School Meetinghouse of Brookfield. They kept Brookfield in their name even after the postal service forced the hamlet to change its name to Slate Hill to avoid confusion with New York's other Brookfield, in Madison County.

After the Civil War stoves provided the building's first heat. Over the next few decades, the congregation began dwindling until its last member died in 1933. But trustees continued to hold the required annual meeting and maintain the building. In 2004, two members were added to the empty congregation by vote of the trustees, presiding pastor, and representative members from other Old School Baptist congregations.

== Aesthetics ==
The minimal, classically inspired ornament on the church's exterior suggests an acknowledgement of the emerging tastes of the time, as the Federal style was taking shape. But the interior's use of heavy, inpainted timber and raised and paneled pews recalls late medieval English building traditions, and the pulpit in particular is of a style found in late 17th- and early 18th-century churches in New England. The Brookfield church is a very late example of a style much more popular long before the Revolution.
