= Stefanie Dolson =

American basketball player (born 1992)

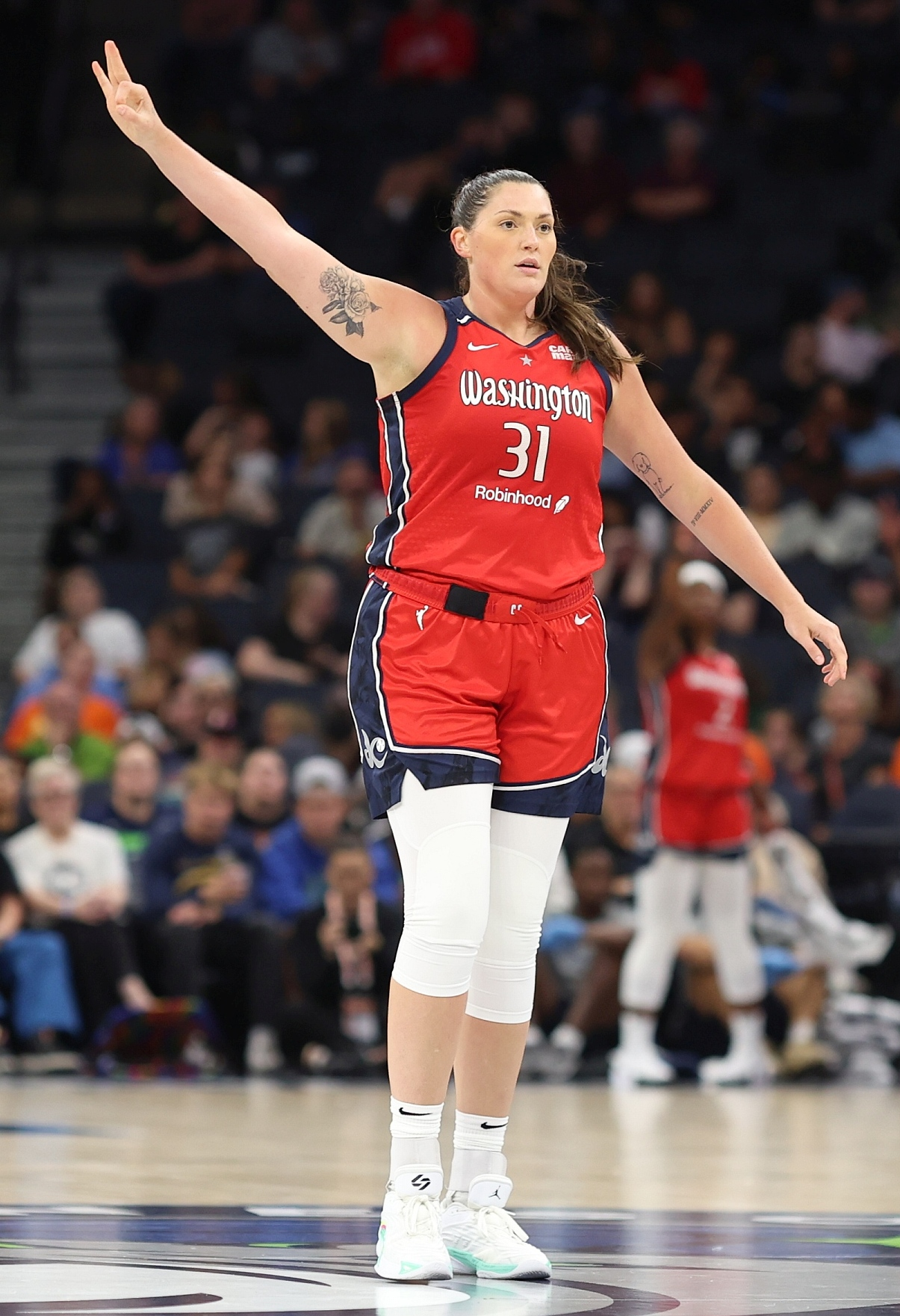
- Dolson with the Washington Mystics in 2024

No. 31 – Seattle Storm
- Position: Center
- League: WNBA

Personal information
- Born: January 8, 1992 (age 34) Port Jervis, New York, U.S.
- Listed height: 6 ft 5 in (1.96 m)
- Listed weight: 235 lb (107 kg)

Career information
- High school: Minisink Valley (Slate Hill, New York)
- College: UConn (2010–2014)
- WNBA draft: 2014: 1st round, 6th overall pick
- Drafted by: Washington Mystics
- Playing career: 2014–present

Career history
- 2014–2016: Washington Mystics
- 2014–2015: WBC Spartak Moscow Region
- 2015–2016: Edirne Belediyesi Edirnespor BK
- 2016: Sichuan Whale
- 2017–2021: Chicago Sky
- 2017–2018: Dike Basket Napoli
- 2018–2019: Henan Phoenix
- 2019–2020: Hebei Win Power
- 2022–2023: Sopron Basket
- 2022–2023: New York Liberty
- 2023–2024: ASVEL Féminin
- 2024–2025: Washington Mystics
- 2025: Laces BC
- 2026–present: Seattle Storm

Career highlights
- WNBA champion (2021); 2× WNBA All-Star (2015, 2017); EuroLeague champion (2022); WNBA Commissioner's Cup Champion (2023); 2× NCAA champion (2013, 2014); Senior CLASS Award (2014); AAC Defensive Player of the Year (2014); WBCA Defensive Player of the Year (2014); Second-team All-American – AP (2014); 2× WBCA Coaches' All-American (2013, 2014); 3× All-American – USBWA (2013–2015); First-team All-AAC (2014); Third-team All-American – AP (2013); First-team All-Big East (2013); Big East All-Freshman Team (2011); McDonald's All-American (2010)
- Stats at WNBA.com
- Stats at Basketball Reference
Medals
Women's 3x3 basketball
Representing United States
Olympic Games
Gold medal – first place	2020 Tokyo	Team
Representing United States
Women's basketball
FIBA AmeriCup
Gold medal – first place	2019 Puerto Rico	Team
FIBA Under-19 World Cup
Gold medal – first place	2011 Chile	Team
FIBA Under-18 Americas Championship
Gold medal – first place	2010 United States	Team

Stefanie Marie Dolson (born January 8, 1992) is an American professional basketball player for the Seattle Storm of the Women's National Basketball Association (WNBA). She was drafted sixth overall in the 2014 WNBA draft. Dolson played center for the UConn women's basketball team and won back-to-back national championships in 2013 and 2014. She won a gold medal in 3x3 basketball at the 2020 Summer Olympics.

== Early life ==
Dolson played volleyball and basketball at Minisink Valley High School in Slate Hill, New York and was a member of the National Honor Society. During her junior year she averaged 18.9 points, 16.7 rebounds, 5.0 assists and 6.2 blocks. As a senior, she averaged 22.8 points, 17.6 rebounds, 5.6 assists and 5.2 blocks.

Dolson led Minisink Valley High School to four straight New York State Public High School Athletic Association Section 9 championship game appearances and finished her career at Minisink Valley with 1,951 points and 1,607 rebounds. She was a McDonald's High School All-American and participated in the All-Star game where she had 12 points and eight rebounds in the McDonald's All-American Game.

== College career ==
=== Freshman year ===
As a freshman for UConn in 2010–11, Dolson averaged 10.2 points and 6.1 rebounds per game on the season. On March 8, Dolson recorded 24 points and 9 rebounds in a 73–64 win over Notre Dame at the Big East tournament title game. She was named to the BIG EAST All-Tournament Team. Dolson was subsequently named to the Big East Rookie Team alongside teammate Bria Hartley.

=== Sophomore year ===
Dolson completed her sophomore season averaging 23.9 minutes, 10.4 points, 6.0 rebounds and 1.5 blocks per game. Dolson started her second year in strong form, however, her output slowed, and her scoring average dropped below ten points for her last eighteen regular season games. At the Final Four, Dolson came back strong, she scored 20 points in the overtime loss to Notre Dame.

=== Junior year ===
In her junior season, Dolson was named to the All-BIG EAST First Team after leading the Huskies in rebounding (7.1) and finishing third on the team in scoring (13.6). She posted career-high four double-doubles. Dolson made her third-straight All-BIG EAST Tournament team after posting a double-double 18-points and 14 rebounds effort in the 61–59 loss to Notre Dame in the BIG EAST Championship Final. She helped the Huskies win the 2013 NCAA championship and subsequently being named to the All-Final Four team.

=== Senior year ===
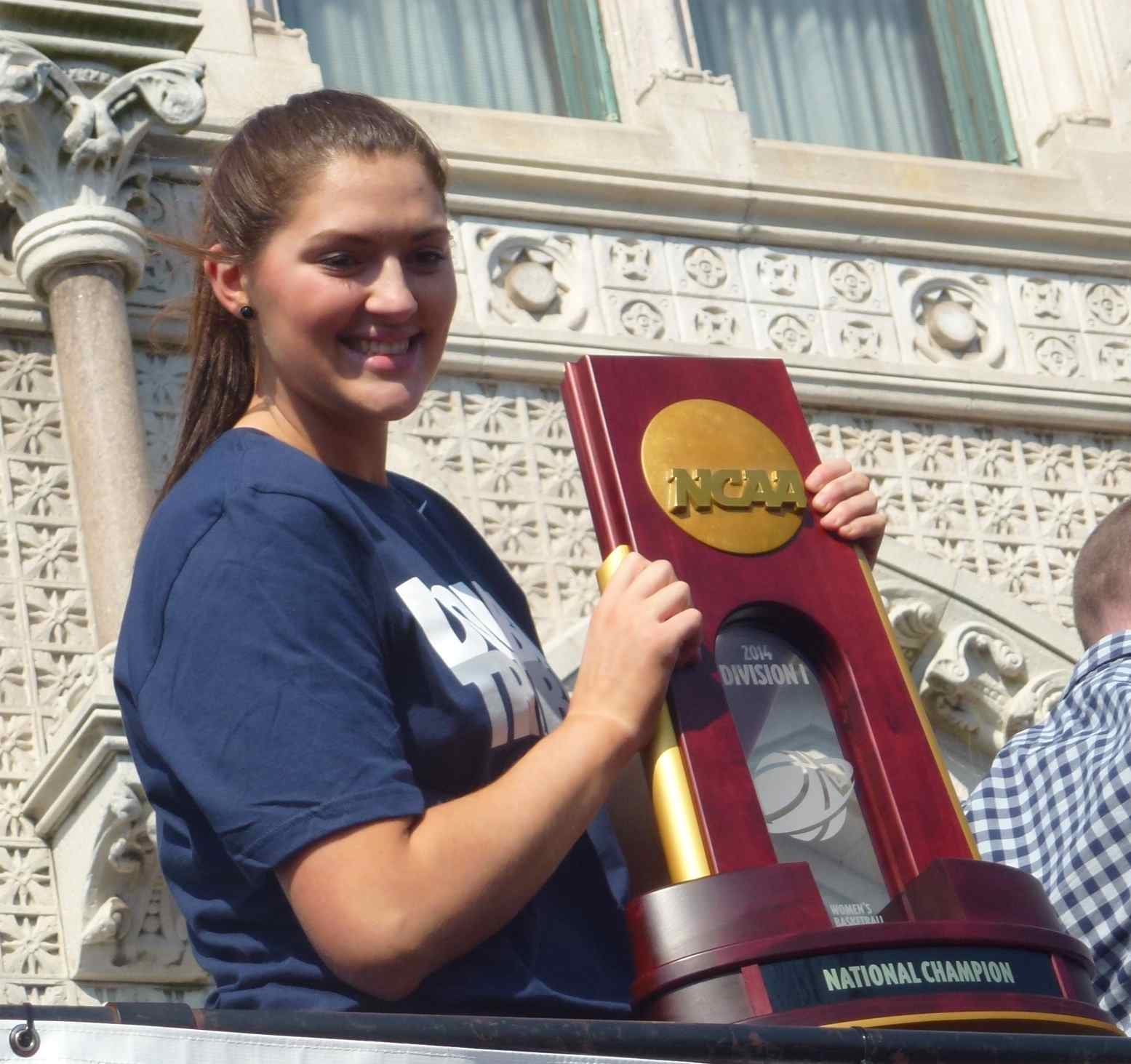
Stefanie Dolson holding the championship trophy at the 2014 UConn men and women's national championship parade

Dolson was named the National Defensive Player of the Year and the league's Defensive Player and 2.3 blocks per game, and recorded the third triple-double in school history with 24 points, 14 rebounds and 11 assists against Oregon. Dolson recorded 371 rebounds, the second most rebounds in school history. Her 93 blocks was the third most in a single season history. She helped lead her team to an undefeated 40–0 season and the 2014 National Championship, was named to the 2014 NCAA Final Four All-Tournament team, and was later inducted into the Huskies of Honor on senior night. Dolson led UConn to a 144–11 record over her four-year career, which included four Final Four appearances and back to back National Championships. She finished her career ranking 12th in points (1,797), fourth in field goal percentage (.588), fourth in rebounds (1,101), and fourth in blocks (253).

== Professional career ==
=== WNBA ===
==== Washington Mystics (2014–17) ====
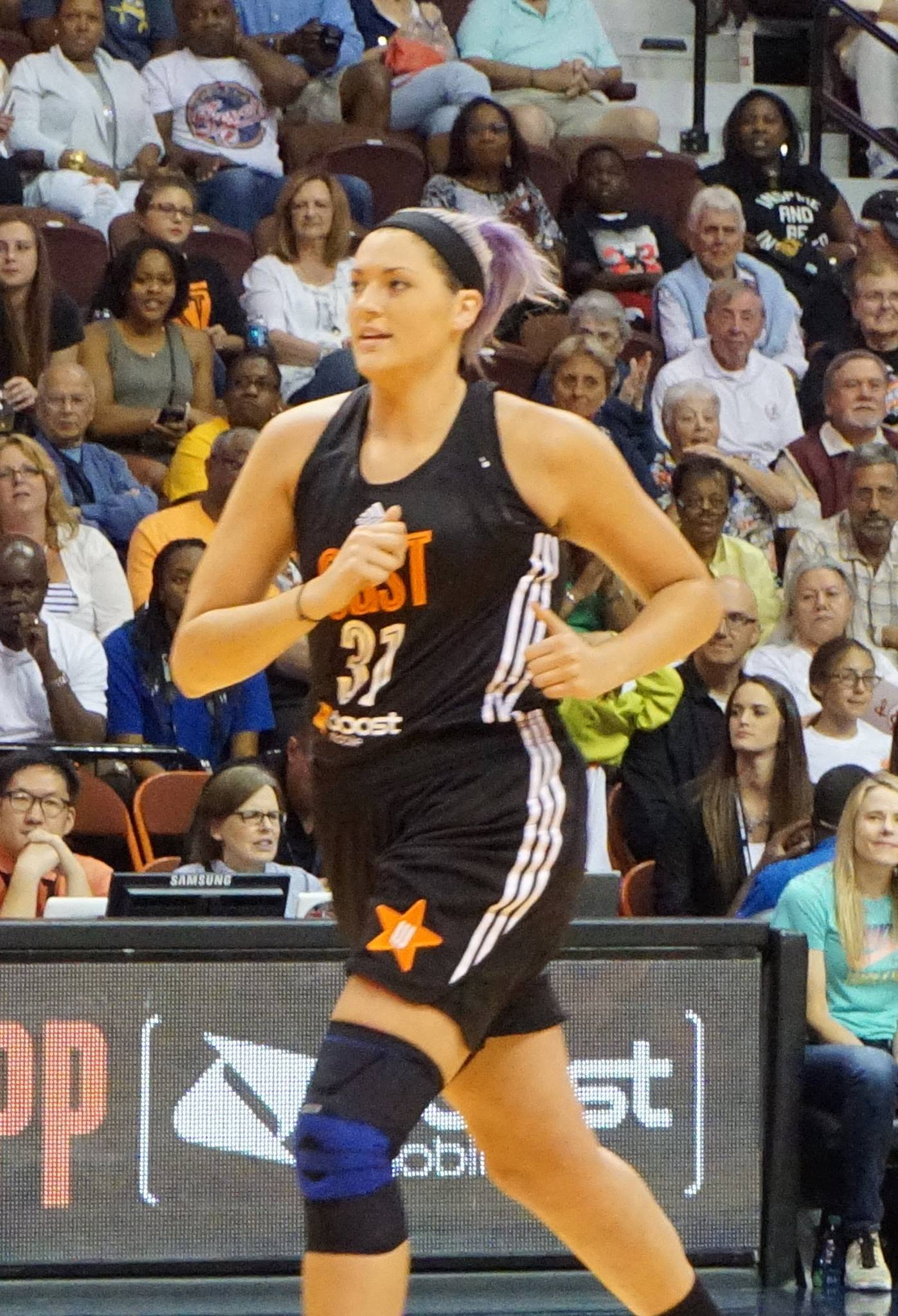
Stefanie Dolson at the 2015 All-Star game

Dolson was drafted sixth overall in the 2014 WNBA draft by Washington Mystics. UConn teammate Bria Hartley was drafted right after her by the Seattle Storm and thereafter traded to the Mystics. On June 1, 2014, in a triple-overtime victory against the Los Angeles Sparks, the UConn duo of Dolson and Hartley combined for 34 points coming off the bench and Dolson recorded her first career double-double with 14 points and 11 rebounds. In her first career start on August 14, 2014, Dolson had her second career double-double with 12 points and 10 rebounds in a regular season loss to the Chicago Sky. The Mystics finished third place in the Eastern Conference but were swept in the first round of the playoffs by the Indiana Fever.

In the 2015 WNBA season opener against the Connecticut Sun, Dolson had a stand out dominating performance scoring 18 points and 12 rebounds in a winning effort. Later on in the season, she was selected into the 2015 WNBA All-Star Game as a reserve. Throughout the season, Dolson averaged career-highs in scoring and rebounding. The Mystics would once again reach the playoffs, with the fourth seed in the Eastern Conference, but were yet again a first round exit, losing to the New York Liberty in three games. In the 2016 season, Dolson continued to flourish as a player in the Mystics' starting lineup. In a win against the New York Liberty, she scored a career-high 23 points. During that game, she had also achieved career-highs in field goals made and three-pointers made. However, the Mystics would miss the playoffs with a disappointing 13–21 record.

==== Chicago Sky (2017–2021) ====
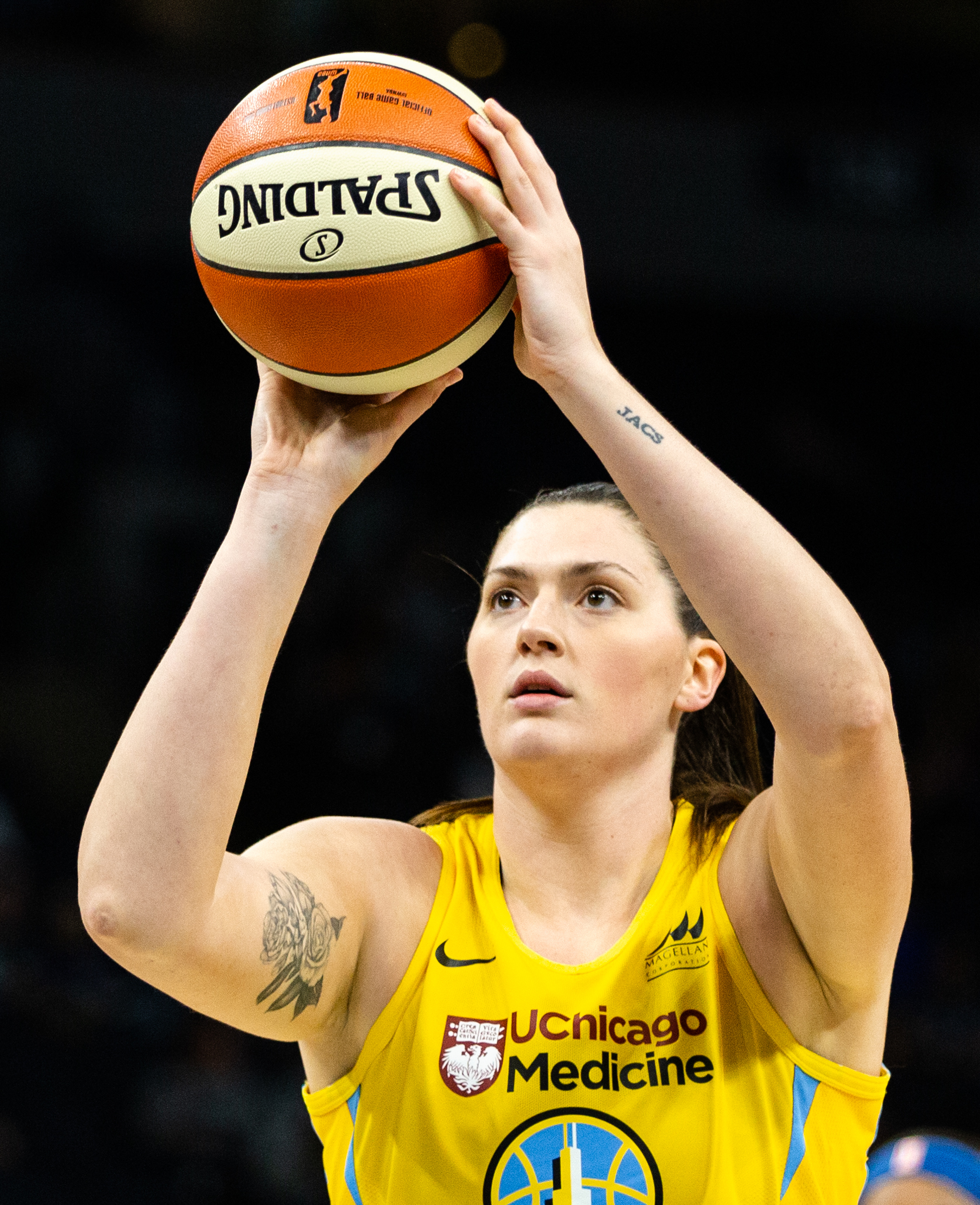
Dolson with the Chicago Sky in 2019

After three seasons with the Mystics, Dolson was traded to the Chicago Sky along with teammate Kahleah Copper, and the second overall pick in the 2017 WNBA draft, for Elena Delle Donne.

On May 14, 2017, in her debut with the Sky, Dolson scored 9 points along with 2 rebounds in a 70–61 loss to the Minnesota Lynx. On May 21, 2017, Dolson tied her career-high of 23 points along with 8 rebounds and a new career-high of 5 blocks in a 75–71 victory over the Atlanta Dream. Two months later, on July 28, 2017, Dolson scored a new career-high of 29 points in an 86–80 loss to the Phoenix Mercury. By the end of the season, Dolson averaged new career-highs in scoring and rebounding with 14.5 ppg and 5.8 rpg, but the Sky finished 12-22 and were eliminated from playoff contention.

In February 2018, Dolson re-signed with the Sky to a multi-year deal in free agency. In 2018, the Sky missed out on the playoffs as they finished with a 13–21 record.

In February 2020, Dolson re-signed with the Sky on a new two-year deal. In the 2021 WNBA season, Dolson and the Chicago Sky won their first WNBA championship.

==== New York Liberty (2022–2023) ====
On February 3, 2022, Dolson signed a two-year guaranteed deal with the New York Liberty. In the 2022 WNBA season, the Liberty made it to the playoffs, where they lost in the first round, 1–2, to the Sky. Dolson started in all 36 regular-season and 3 playoff games for the team.

For the 2023 WNBA season, the Liberty acquired several high-profile frontcourt players, such as Breanna Stewart and Jonquel Jones. Coupled with an ankle injury, this significantly limited Dolson's role and playing time throughout the season. Dolson reached the WNBA Finals for the second time in her career with the Liberty, but they lost the series 1–3 to the Las Vegas Aces.

==== Second stint with the Washington Mystics (2024–2025) ====
On February 14, 2024, Dolson signed a two-year contract with the Washington Mystics, returning to the team 10 years after being drafted. With the Mystics, Dolson leaned even more into her three-point shooting skills, playing in a stretch four or stretch five role. Her shooting proficiency earned her a spot in the 2024 All-Star Weekend Three-Point Contest. On August 17, 2024, in an 83–99 loss to the Minnesota Lynx, Dolson tied a WNBA record for the most made three-pointers without a miss with six.

==== Seattle Storm (2026–present) ====
On April 12, 2026, it was announced that Dolson had joined the Seattle Storm as a free agent.

=== Overseas ===
In the 2014-15 WNBA off-season, Dolson played in Russia for WBC Spartak Moscow Region. In the 2015-16 WNBA off-season, Dolson played in Turkey for Edirne Belediyesi Edirnespor BK. In the 2016-17 WNBA off-season, Dolson briefly played in China for the Sichuan Whale. In 2017, Dolson signed with Dike Basket Napoli of the Italian League for the 2017-18 WNBA off-season. In October 2018, Dolson signed with the Henan Phoenix of the Chinese League for the 2018-19 off-season.

=== Unrivaled ===
On November 12, 2024, it was announced that Dolson would appear and play in the inaugural 2025 season of Unrivaled, the women's 3-on-3 basketball league founded by Napheesa Collier and Breanna Stewart. She played for the Laces in the 2025 season.

== National team career ==
Dolson was named to the USA Basketball U18 team. The USA team was one of eight teams from North, South and Central America, along with the Caribbean, invited to participate in the 2010 FIBA Americas U18 Championship for Women, held at the U.S. Olympic Training Center, in Colorado Springs, Colorado. The 2010 USA Basketball U18 National Team that compiled a perfect 5–0, earned the 2010 FIBA Americas Championship gold medal and qualified the US for the 2011 FIBA U19 World Championship.

Dolson was named to the USA Basketball U19 team. The 2011 USA Basketball U19 World Championship Team that posted an 8–1 record and captured the gold medal in Valdivia, Chile.

In 2021, Dolson was part of the USA team that won the first Olympic gold medal in 3x3 basketball. They defeated the Russian Olympic Committee in the gold medal game.

== Career statistics ==
Legend
GP	Games played	GS	Games started	MPG	Minutes per game	RPG	Rebounds per game
APG	Assists per game	SPG	Steals per game	BPG	Blocks per game	PPG	Points per game
TO	Turnovers per game	FG%	Field-goal percentage	3P%	3-point field-goal percentage	FT%	Free-throw percentage
**Bold**	Career best	°	League leader

†	Denotes season(s) in which Dolson won a WNBA championship
*	Denotes season(s) in which Dolson won an NCAA Championship

=== WNBA ===
==== Regular season ====
Stats current through end of 2026 season

WNBA regular season statistics
Year	Team	GP	GS	MPG	FG%	3P%	FT%	RPG	APG	SPG	BPG	TO	PPG
2014	Washington	34	1	18.4	.492	.000	.811	4.4	1.2	0.4	1.1	1.7	6.0
2015	Washington	34	33	24.7	.495	**.476**	.871	5.6	1.6	0.5	1.1	1.9	10.6
2016	Washington	34	31	22.5	.482	.300	.843	4.7	1.1	0.4	0.9	1.1	9.3
2017	Chicago	33	33	**29.3**	**.561**	.437	.870	**5.8**	2.6	0.5	**1.3**	2.5	**14.5**
2018	Chicago	27	25	27.6	.467	.346	.938	4.6	**3.0**	**0.6**	0.9	1.8	9.7
2019	Chicago	34	34	25.0	.519	.361	.898	5.6	2.2	**0.6**	1.0	1.9	9.3
2020	Chicago	15	8	18.2	.486	.375	.737	3.5	1.7	0.4	0.9	1.0	6.3
2021^{†}	Chicago	24	15	20.0	.486	.404	**.947**	3.5	1.3	0.3	0.8	1.3	7.5
2022	New York	36	36	22.9	.493	.394	.905	4.8	1.8	0.4	0.8	1.6	8.1
2023	New York	23	0	11.9	.515	.462	.786	2.0	1.2	0.0	0.3	0.9	4.0
2024	Washington	39	**39**	25.9	.475	.465	.786	4.9	2.6	0.5	0.5	1.7	9.5
2025	Washington	43	14	15.2	.423	.360	.700	2.3	1.4	0.3	0.3	**0.7**	3.7
2026	Seattle	**44**	12	15.0	.447	.404	.853	2.4	1.2	0.3	0.4	0.9	3.3
**Career**	13 years, 4 teams	420	281	21.4	.494	.403	.852	4.2	1.7	0.4	0.8	1.5	7.8
**Career**	All-Star	2	0	14.4	.400	.333	—	3.5	1.0	0.5	0.5	0.5	4.5

==== Playoffs ====
WNBA playoff statistics
Year	Team	GP	GS	MPG	FG%	3P%	FT%	RPG	APG	SPG	BPG	TO	PPG
2014	Washington	2	0	18.8	.300	—	**1.000**	1.5	0.5	0.0	1.0	2.5	5.0
2015	Washington	3	**3**	22.0	.480	.000	.750	5.3	1.0	0.3	**1.3**	0.3	9.0
2019	Chicago	2	2	**28.0**	**.600**	.571	**1.000**	**7.0**	**3.0**	**0.5**	1.0	1.0	**14.5**
2020	Chicago	1	0	16.0	.250	.000	—	2.0	**3.0**	0.0	1.0	**0.0**	2.0
2021^{†}	Chicago	**10**	0	16.8	.512	.294	**1.000**	2.8	1.1	0.2	0.7	1.1	4.9
2022	New York	3	**3**	26.3	.444	**.600**	—	3.7	2.7	0.0	1.0	0.3	6.3
2023	New York	**10**	0	4.6	.500	.200	.000	0.5	0.1	0.0	0.1	0.3	1.3
**Career**	7 years, 3 teams	31	8	15.1	.485	.342	.667	2.5	1.1	0.1	0.6	0.7	4.8

=== College ===
NCAA statistics
Year	Team	GP	GS	MPG	FG%	3P%	FT%	RPG	APG	SPG	BPG	TO	PPG
2010–11	Connecticut	38	36	24.2	**.616**	.000	**.816**	6.1	1.6	0.5	1.2	**2.1**	10.2
2011–12	Connecticut	38	38	23.9	.586	.000	.810	6.0	1.7	0.8	1.5	2.4	10.4
2012–13*	Connecticut	38	37	26.8	.593	**.421**	.796	7.1	3.1	**1.1**	1.5	2.3	**13.6**
2013–14*	Connecticut	**40**	**40**	**32.3**	.564	.296	.792	**9.3**	**3.4**	1.0	**2.3**	2.6	12.5
**Career**		154	151	26.9	.588	.327	.802	7.2	2.5	0.9	1.6	2.3	11.7

== Personal life ==
Dolson is a descendant of the 17th century Minisink, NY-area settler and beaver pelt trader James Dolson, for whom a major commercial roadway is now named; he had five sons, one of whom died in the American Revolution. The daughter of Steve and Kristal Dolson, Stefanie has two older sisters, Ashley and Courtney, and one younger brother, Jake.

In 2016, Dolson publicly came out as a member of the LGBTQ community. She spoke out on her sexuality in an interview with ESPN Magazine by saying: "Not everyone in the WNBA needs to be out, but I feel called to lead an authentic life in the open. I know who I am and I don't care if people judge me. I am 6-5, and I dye my hair purple and experiment a lot with fashion. My motto is: If they're going to stare, they might as well stare at something fun. There are a lot of girls who struggle being who they are. We need people who are out so that those girls know it's OK to be themselves, regardless of stereotypes. By being open, I give them someone to look up to, and however they identify, I can inspire them to support equality and LGBT issues."

In 2019, Dolson played on the "Away" roster during the NBA All-Star Celebrity Game at the Bojangles Coliseum in Charlotte, North Carolina.

On November 4, 2026, Dolson engaged to Kristen Podlovits.

== Awards and honors ==
- Two-Time BIG EAST Freshman of the Week
- 2010–11 BIG EAST All–Rookie Team
- 2010–11 BIG EAST All–Tournament Team
- 2011–12 Wooden Award Preseason Top–30
- 2011–12 Preseason Wade Watch List
- 2011–12 Preseason All–BIG EAST Honorable Mention
- 2011–12 Preseason Naismith Award Watch List
- 2011–12 BIG EAST All–Tournament Team
- 2011–12 All–BIG EAST Honorable Mention
- 2011–12 NCAA All–Kingston Regional Team
- 2012–13 Wooden Award Preseason Top–30
- 2012–13 Naismith Award Preseason Watch List
- 2012–13 BIG EAST All–Tournament Team
- 2012–13 All–BIG EAST First Team
- 2012–13 Associated Press All–America Third Team
- 2012–13 USBWA All–America Team
- 2012–13 WBCA/State Farm All–America Team
- 2013–14 Senior Class Award
- 2013–14 AAC Defensive Player of the Year
- 2013-14 WBCA National Defensive Player of the Year
