= Dave Telgheder =

American baseball player (born 1966)

- Pitcher
- Born: November 11, 1966 (age 59); Middletown, New York, U.S.
- Batted: Right Threw: Right

MLB debut
- June 12, 1993, for the New York Mets

Last MLB appearance
- June 2, 1998, for the Oakland Athletics

MLB statistics
- Win–loss record: 15–19
- Earned run average: 5.23
- Strikeouts: 158
- Stats at Baseball Reference

Teams
- New York Mets (1993–1995); Oakland Athletics (1996–1998)

David William Telgheder (born November 11, 1966) is an American former Major League Baseball (MLB) pitcher who played for the New York Mets and Oakland Athletics from 1993 to 1998.

== Early life and amateur career ==
Telgedher was born in New York to Bill and Ruth Telgedher and raised on the fruit farm his parents owned in Slate Hill, New York. As a youth, he idolized Catfish Hunter and Ron Guidry and was a fan of the New York Yankees "until Steinbrenner started trading everybody," including Chris Chambliss, Graig Nettles and Sparky Lyle.

Telgheder attended the University of Massachusetts Amherst, and in 1987 he played collegiate summer baseball with the Harwich Mariners of the Cape Cod Baseball League. He was selected by the Mets in the 31st round of the 1989 MLB draft.

== Professional career ==
In 1999 he pitched for the Buffalo Bisons in the Cleveland Indians organization.

== Coaching and broadcasting career ==
He is currently an assistant principal and pitching coach for his alma mater, Minisink Valley High School in Slate Hill, New York. He also serves as a color commentator for Time Warner Cable 6 broadcasts of Hudson Valley Renegades baseball games.
