= Minisink Valley High School =

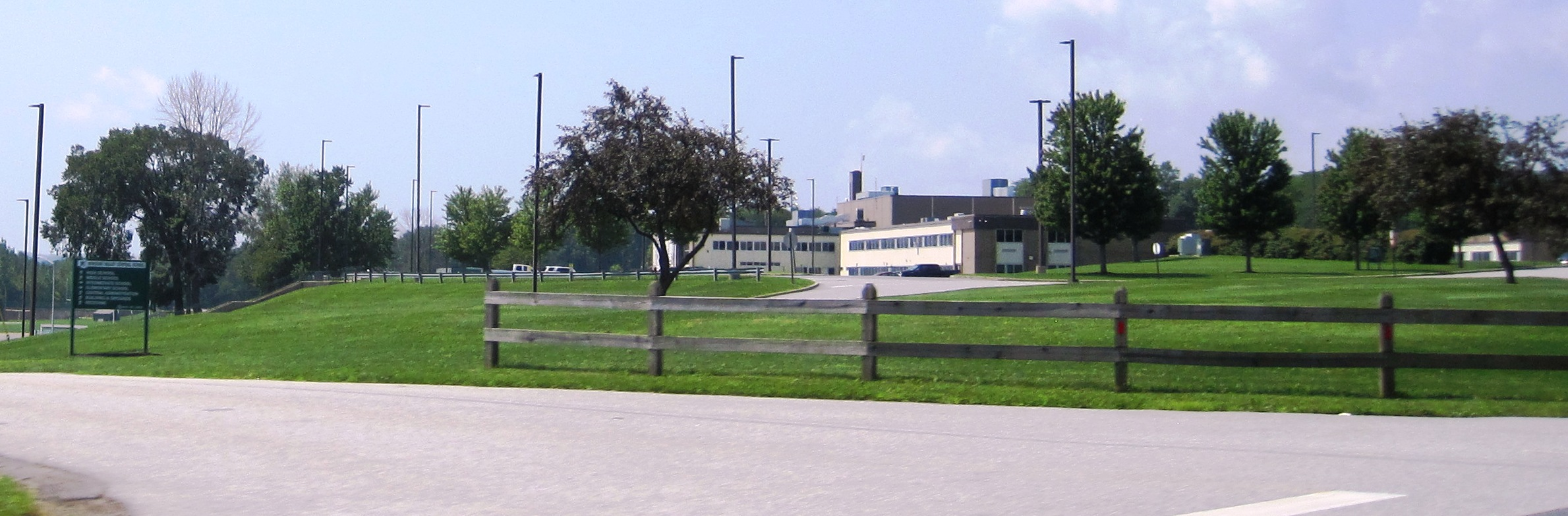

Location
- 2320 Route 6 Slate Hill, New York; United States
- Coordinates: 41.3842°N 74.5116°W

Information
- Type: Public (Exam school) secondary
- Established: 1958
- School district: Minisink Valley Central School District
- Principal: Ken Hauck
- Faculty: 90.50 (FTE)
- Grades: 9–12
- Enrollment: 1,116 (2023-2024)
- Student to teacher ratio: 12.33
- Colors: Forest & white
- Mascot: Minisink Warrior
- Yearbook: Valé

Minisink Valley High School is a secondary school located in Slate Hill, New York. It contains an enrollment of over 1100 students. The school, part of the Minisink Valley Central School District, was established in 1958 as a secondary school for grades 7–10. A junior class established in the 1959–60 school year became the first class to graduate in June 1961. Over the next decade, enrollment in the school increased so rapidly that in 1971, a bond was passed by district residents to build a new high school adjacent to the original school building. Reginald G. Kierstead High School was completed in 1974 and provided a comfortable home for the upperclassmen of the district. Additions were made in the years following 9/11 to accompany the expanding class sizes due to suburbanization. Both high school and middle school buildings have seen recent additions to the response of larger class sizes, along with the completion of new pool and track facilities. Minisink ceased the use of Native American imagery in their logo and mascot in 2023 following a New York State law prohibiting the use of Native American imagery by public schools, however, they continued to use the name "Warriors".

== Student body ==
Enrollment at Minisink Valley High School was 1,160 students as of the 2020–2021 school year. The student body was made up of 889 White students, 199 Hispanic students, 52 Black students, 17 Asian students, and 3 Native American students. 291 students were eligible for free or reduced price lunch that year. With 88.8 FTE teachers, there is a student-to-teacher ratio of 13 to 1.

== Athletics ==
Boys varsity sports include football, basketball, track and field, cross country, soccer, lacrosse, golf, tennis, wrestling, swimming and diving, and baseball. Girls varsity sports include basketball, track and field, cross country, soccer, lacrosse, golf, tennis, wrestling, swimming and diving, softball, cheerleading, flag football, and volleyball.

The Minisink Valley wrestling program is a perennial state-level powerhouse, winning dual meet state championships in 2015, 2020, and 2022; as well as setting the team points record at the NYSPHSAA Wrestling Championships in 2022. Individually, 5 Minisink wrestlers have won New York state titles; including 2022 UWW U17 Freestyle World Bronze medalist Zack Ryder, who has won 3.

The Minisink Valley boys lacrosse program is consistently locally successful as well, most notably having produced former MLL player Joseph Sessa. Sessa went on to win the 2018 NCAA Men's Division I Lacrosse Championship as a member of the Yale Bulldogs

== Notable alumni ==
- Nicholas Abruzzese – NHL player for the Tampa Bay Lightning, 2022 Olympian for Team USA in Men's Ice Hockey
- Karl A. Brabenec – New York State Assemblyman - 98th District
- Stefanie Dolson – WNBA All-Star, 2020 Olympic gold medalist in women's 3x3 basketball
- Kyle Filipowski – Basketball player for the Utah Jazz (attended Minisink Valley through 9th grade before transferring to Fordham Preparatory School)
- Mike Martucci – New York State Senator - 42nd District
- Dave Telgheder – former MLB pitcher for the New York Mets and Oakland Athletics
- Josh Walker – MLB pitcher for the Baltimore Orioles
- Jeremy Zuckerman – Multiple Emmy Award-winning composer

== Extracurricular activities ==
The school offers a variety of clubs and extra curricular activities for its students. Among these is a quarterly Coffee House, hosted by S.A.D.D. This gathering of student spectators and performers assemble to play music and engage in other various arts to raise money for current charities with money charged for admission.'

== Controversies ==
The Minisink Valley High School has had reported repeat issues in dealing with racism, sexism, sexual abuse, and bullying over the years. These include allegations of racist or violent messages, social media posts, actions, attire, remarks or chants directed at or by students; not fairly recognizing female athletes and sports programs; failure to adequately identify and discipline the perpetrators of racist, violent, or sexual acts; failure to adequately protect students from sexual abuse; and the flying and display of the Confederate Flag and other controversial images and items on students' personal vehicles at school property beginning at least in the 1990's through early to mid 2000's, which was only somewhat recently prohibited by updates to the school's code of conduct within the past several years.

The school has been criticized for its alleged lackluster response to addressing these and other issues of race, sexual abuse/harassment, diversity and equity leading to lower ratings in those categories on educational rating sites. The school district, however, denies that it fosters such an environment or has failed to adequately address or discipline the perpetrators of these and other incidents and has stated that it expressly prohibits all such discriminatory, violent, racist or sexist actions and activities in its Code of Conduct.
