= New Hampton, New York =

Hamlet in New York, United States

Hampton New Hampton
- Hamlet
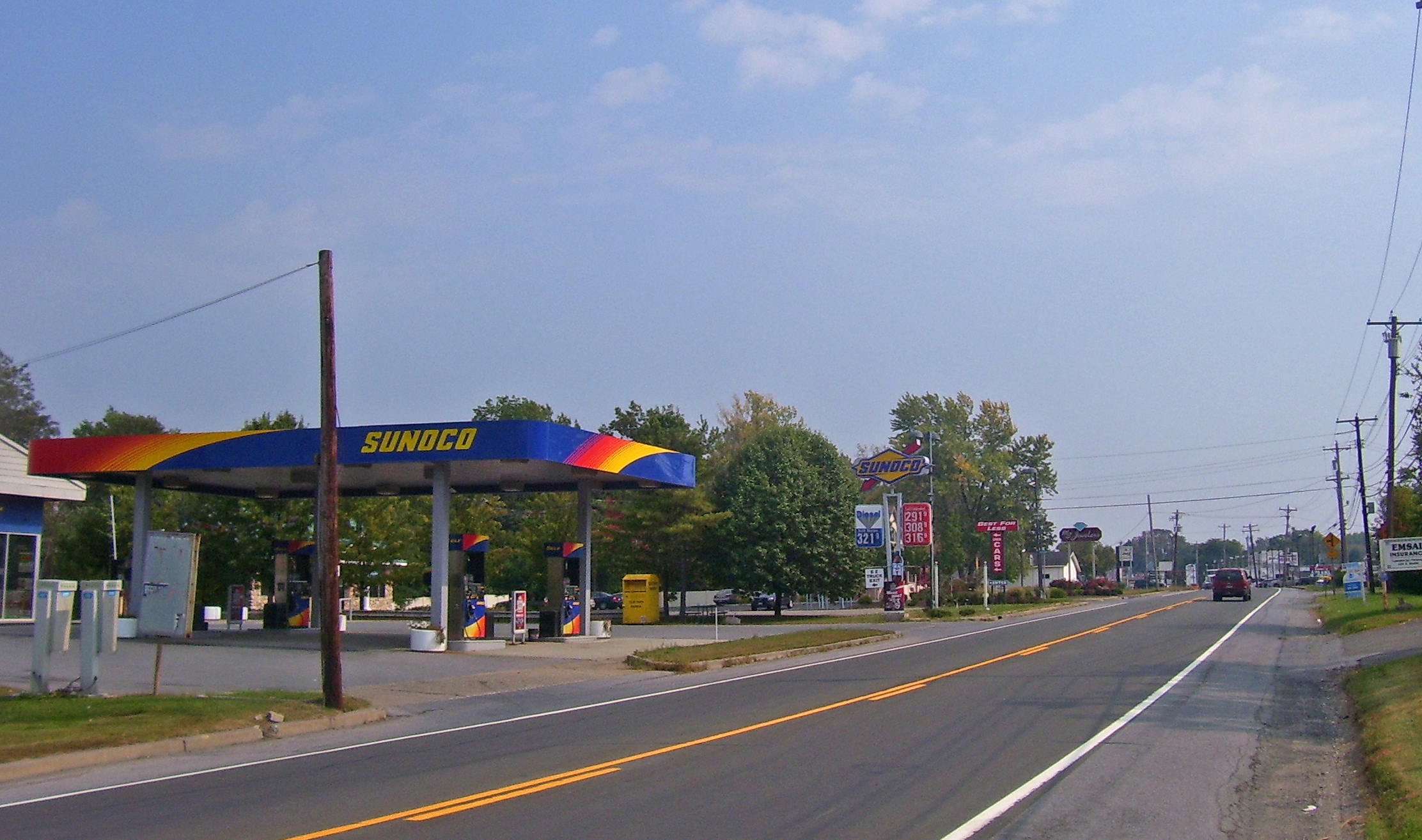
- Central New Hampton, along Routes 6 and 17M

- Location within the state of New York
- Coordinates: 41.4118°N 74.4201°W
- Country: United States
- State: New York
- County: Orange
- Town: Wawayanda
- Website: www.townofwawayanda.com

New Hampton is a hamlet in the Town of Wawayanda in Orange County, New York, United States. It is just outside the city of Middletown, across Interstate 84.

New Hampton extends from the northern part of Orange County's "Black Dirt Region" near Pine Island to NY 17M adjoining Middletown, New York.
