= Minisink Valley Central School District =

School district in the U.S. state of New York

The Minisink Valley Central School District is a unified school district in Orange County, New York. The district consists of five schools; an elementary, intermediate, middle, and high school, which are all located in the township of Wawayanda, New York and the Otisville Elementary school, located in the village of the same name. Although one of the last school districts to formulate in New York, Minisink boasts one of the largest campuses in the state, with its buildings, sports fields, and facilities covering 145 acres (0.59 km^{2}) in the western Hudson Valley. The enrollment of the five schools comprises approximately 4,700 students from the surrounding towns and hamlets of Minisink, Greenville, Wawayanda, New Hampton, Mount Hope, Mamakating and Wallkill. The school gets its name from the valley for which it is located. Its school mascot is the Minisink Warrior.

== Board of education ==
Minisink Valley's school district includes a voter elected and unpaid Board of Education that has duties regarding legal matters as well as policy review and implementation. The board usually holds bi-monthly meetings with the public as well as committee meetings. Committees are formed around a variety of functions, such as finance, building and grounds, and audits. Listed are the current board members:

Board Members:

- Mr. Joseph Flaherty, President (Term expiring June 30, 2025)
- Mr. William Cooper, Vice President (Term expiring June 30, 2025)
- Mr. Shawn Cahill (Term expiring June 30, 2026)
- Ms. Kathlee DeRose (Term expiring June 30, 2027)
- Dr. Scott Hines (Term expiring June 30, 2027)
- Ms. Ruth Luis (Term expiring June 30, 2026)
- Ms. Patricia M. Reynolds (Term expiring June 30, 2026)
- Mr. Anthony Monaco (Term expiring June 30, 2027)
- Ms. Vanessa Wight (Term expiring June 30, 2025)

== Minisink Elementary ==
The elementary school on the Minisink Valley campus currently enrolls 665 students in grades K-2. It is housed in the original Minisink Valley School building, built in 1958. At first the building served grades K-12, but was relieved of its large capacity with the building of a high school in the 1970s. Today the building is shared, with the elementary school in one wing and the intermediate school in the other.

== Otisville Elementary ==
The Mary P. Bonen Otisville Elementary School consists of approximately 400 students with 16 classes in grades K-5. The school joined the Minisink school district in 1973, before which time Otisville was a K-12 school. The current principal is Julia Downey. The current assistant principal is Nikachi Griffin. A new building has been erected in Otisville to meet the growing class sizes, which can be partially explained by the population increase of the region due to suburbanization.

== Intermediate School ==
The intermediate school is located on the main Minisink campus. Formed in 1991, the school is found in one wing of the original building (the elementary school is in the other wing.) Currently the intermediate school has approximately 900 students in grades 3-5.

== High school ==
See Minisink Valley High School
