= Slate Hill, New York =

Slate Hill
- Hamlet
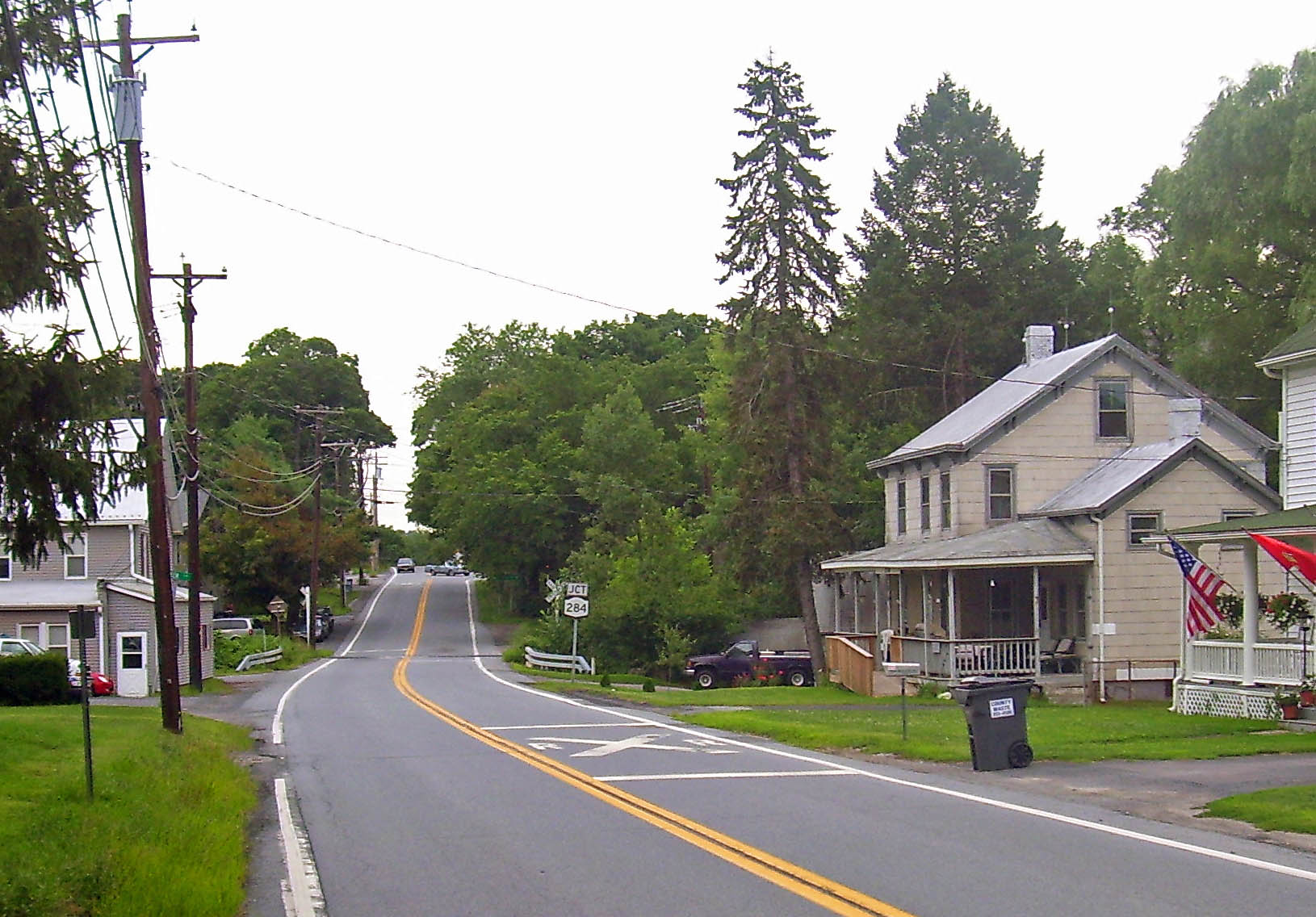
- Slate Hill, looking east along US 6.

- Location within New York
- Coordinates: 41°23′N 74°28′W
- Country: United States
- State: New York
- County: Orange
- Time zone: UTC-5 (Eastern (EST))
  - Summer (DST): UTC-4 (EDT)
- ZIP Code: 10973

Slate Hill is one of the eight hamlets found in the town of Wawayanda, New York. It is home to the Minisink Valley Central School District. Slate Hill is found in Orange County, New York, United States, one of the fastest-growing counties in the state. The area, along with its surrounding regions and the county in which it resides, has seen a recent surge in population growth that can be partially attributed to suburbanization from the New York City metropolitan area. This growth reached a peak in the Post-9/11 era, but has since seen a decrease in the past three years.

== Origins ==
At the dawn of the American Revolution, a Native American by the name of Keghgekapowell supposedly received a patent for the land of present-day Slate Hill, as this is the name found on the Wawayanda Patent. When his tribe, probably from the Algonquin Nation of the Lenni Lenape, had left the land to go West, Keghgekapowell was said to have gone with them never to return. The site of his abandoned estate is located on a hill on present day Jogee Road. The road was named after Keghgekapowell since his name had taken the simpler form of Jogee by European settlers.

One of the early settlers, Richard Wood, built Woodlawn Farm, and was one of the original members of the Primitive Baptist Church of Brookfield. Both his house and church, the oldest buildings in Slate Hill, still stand and are listed on the National Register of Historic Places.

Slate Hill was originally to be named Brookfield, for the brook that encircled the community. When the postal system was establishing itself after the American Revolution, the government had discovered that there already existed a Brookfield in Madison County, N.Y. and thus opted for the name Slate Hill. The present name is after the slate ridge upon which the town site is situated.

== Politics ==
Slate Hill is currently in New York's 18th congressional district. Its current Congressman is Democrat Pat Ryan. Although the area was previously thought to be populated mostly by Republicans, out of the reported $91,039 in presidential campaign contributions accounted for by Slate Hill's area code of 10973, $47,900 was contributed to Democratic candidate Hillary Clinton. Locally, Slate Hill's Town Hall is located within the town of Wawayanda.

== Commerce ==
Only a handful of industries currently call Slate Hill home. Balchem Incorporated was founded at its present location along the former rail line in Slate Hill. The remaining industries in Slate Hill are primarily service and/or cottage industries. There have been several small strip malls which have appeared in the post 9/11 period, namely Slate Hill Commons. Also, a select number of premium restauranters have established taverns, pubs and cafes in recent years. Multiple delis have opened up recently along with a takeout only eatery.
