= Wawayanda, New York =

- Town
- Town of Wawayanda
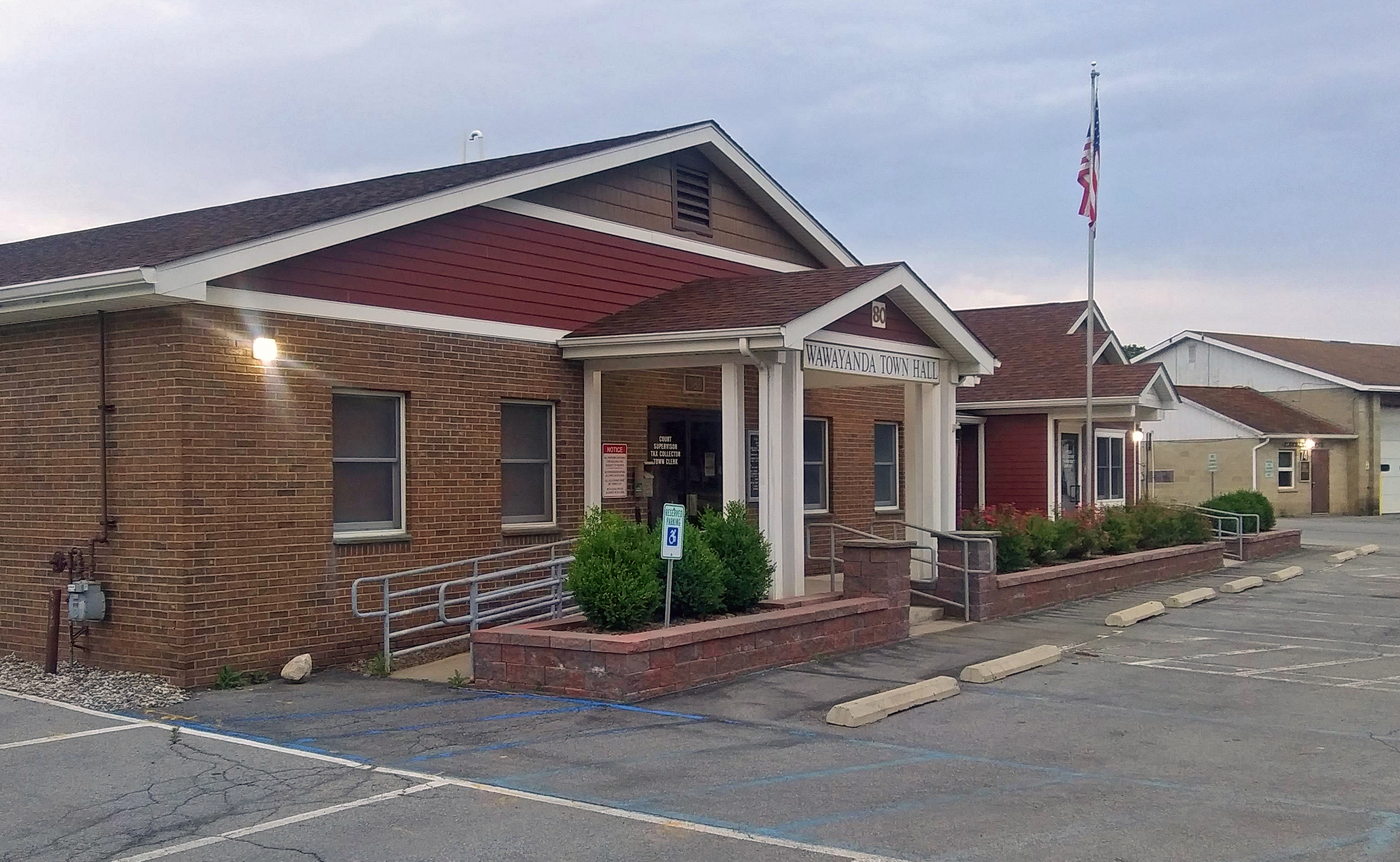
- Town hall

- Location in Orange County and the state of New York.

- Location within the state of New York
- Coordinates: 41°23′36″N 74°27′24″W
- Country: United States
- State: New York
- County: Orange

Area
  - Total: 35.03 sq mi (90.72 km^{2})
  - Land: 34.72 sq mi (89.92 km^{2})
  - Water: 0.31 sq mi (0.80 km^{2})
- Elevation: 560 ft (170 m)

Population (2020)
  - Total: 7,534
  - Density: 217.0/sq mi (83.79/km^{2})
- Time zone: UTC-5 (Eastern (EST))
  - Summer (DST): UTC-4 (EDT)
- FIPS code: 36-78839
- GNIS feature ID: 0979610
- Website: Town website

Wawayanda is a town in Orange County, New York, United States. The population was 7,534 as recorded by the 2020 census. The town of Wawayanda is in the western part of the county, south of Middletown.

== History ==
The town of Wawayanda was established in 1849 from the town of Minisink. It had been first settled after the American Revolution. The name Wawayanda had historically been more broadly used to describe the region, even earlier than a 1769 map, which also shows the line of partition used to resolve the 50-years long New York – New Jersey Line War.

== Geography ==
According to the United States Census Bureau, the town has a total area of 35.0 square miles (91 km^{2}), of which nearly 35.0 square miles (91 km^{2}) is land and 0.1 square miles (0.26 km^{2}) (0.14%) is water.

The town is bordered on the north by the city of Middletown and the town of Wallkill, east by the town of Goshen, south by the town of Warwick, southwest by the town of Minisink, west by the town of Greenville, with a very short shared border with the town of Mount Hope to the northwest.

Interstate 84 and U.S. Route 6 (US 6, the Grand Army of the Republic Highway) are important east–west highways. New York State Route 17M (NY 17M) crosses the northern part of the town. NY 284 is a north–south highway.

== Demographics ==
Historical population
Census	Pop.	Note	%±
1860	2,085		—
1870	1,900		−8.9%
1880	1,879		−1.1%
1890	1,625		−13.5%
1900	1,539		−5.3%
1910	1,603		4.2%
1920	1,689		5.4%
1930	1,946		15.2%
1940	2,218		14.0%
1950	2,435		9.8%
1960	3,229		32.6%
1970	3,408		5.5%
1980	4,298		26.1%
1990	5,518		28.4%
2000	6,273		13.7%
2010	7,266		15.8%
2020	7,534		3.7%
U.S. Decennial Census

As of the 2010 census, the population was 7,266. The racial makeup was 80.7% white, 12.2% Hispanic, 5.0% African-American, 1.9% Asian, and 0.2% Native American.

As of the census of 2000, there were 6,273 people, 2,095 households, and 1,719 families residing in the town. The population density was 179.3 inhabitants per square mile (69.2/km^{2}). There were 2,174 housing units at an average density of 62.1 per square mile (24.0/km^{2}). The racial makeup of the town was 92.86% white, 1.75% African American, 0.37% Native American, 1.61% Asian, 0.02% Pacific Islander, 1.90% from other races, and 1.50% from two or more races. Hispanic or Latino of any race were 5.88% of the population.

There were 2,095 households, out of which 43.2% had children under the age of 18 living with them, 68.7% were married couples living together, 9.5% had a female householder with no husband present, and 17.9% were non-families. 14.6% of all households were made up of individuals, and 5.5% had someone living alone who was 65 years of age or older. The average household size was 2.98 and the average family size was 3.29.

In the town, the population was spread out, with 29.5% under the age of 18, 6.1% from 18 to 24, 30.1% from 25 to 44, 24.7% from 45 to 64, and 9.5% who were 65 years of age or older. The median age was 37 years. For every 100 females, there were 100.6 males. For every 100 females age 18 and over, there were 96.4 males.

The median income for a household in the town was $61,885, and the median income for a family was $67,479. Males had a median income of $42,491 versus $27,993 for females. The per capita income for the town was $21,856. About 2.8% of families and 3.7% of the population were below the poverty line, including 2.0% of those under age 18 and 4.3% of those age 65 or over.

== Hamlets of Wawayanda ==
- Denton – a hamlet near the eastern town line on NY 17M.
- Gardnerville – a hamlet on County Route 62 (CR 62) in the southern part of the town.
- Millsburgh – a hamlet south of South Centerville on CR 22.
- New Hampton – a hamlet on US 6 in the northeastern part of Wawayanda.
- Pellets Island – a location at the eastern town line.
- Ridgebury – a hamlet east of Slate Hill.
- Slate Hill – a hamlet on US 6 near the eastern town line.
- South Centerville – a hamlet located on US 6 at CR 22, near the western town line.

== Former town supervisors ==
Denise Quinn, (2020- ), Republican

John Razzano, (2006–2020), Republican

Wayne Skinner, (2004–2006), Democrat

Thomas Deblock, (1996–2004), Republican

Jeffrey K. Bridges Jr., (1992–1996), Republican

Ed. Flynn, (1988–1992), Democrat

Brice "Buzzy" Flynn, (1970–1988), Democrat

== See also ==
- Wawayanda Patent, 1703 land grant
- Wawayanda State Park, a nearby New Jersey state park of the same name
