= Spahn tax =

Type of currency transaction tax

A Spahn tax is a type of currency transaction tax that is meant to be used for the purpose of controlling exchange-rate volatility. This idea was proposed by Paul Bernd Spahn in 1995.

== Early history ==
The initial idea for a currency transaction tax is attributed to James Tobin in 1972, a concept now known as a Tobin tax. On 16 June 1995 Spahn, in his analysis of the original idea, concluded that the concept was not viable and suggested an alternative solution to the problem of managing exchange-rate volatility.

== Concept ==
According to Spahn, "Analysis has shown that the Tobin tax as originally proposed is not viable and should be laid aside for good." Furthermore, he believes that "it is virtually impossible to distinguish between normal liquidity trading and speculative 'noise' trading. If the tax is generally applied at high rates, it will severely impair financial operations and create international liquidity problems, especially if derivatives are taxed as well. A lower tax rate would reduce the negative impact on financial markets, but not mitigate speculation where expectations of an exchange rate change exceed the tax margin."

In 1995, Spahn suggested an alternative, involving "a two-tier rate structure consisting of a low-rate financial transactions tax, plus an exchange surcharge at prohibitive rates as a piggyback. The latter would be dormant in times of normal financial activities, and be activated only in the case of speculative attacks. The mechanism allowing the identification of abnormal trading in world financial markets would make reference to a 'crawling peg' with an appropriate exchange rate band. The exchange rate would move freely within this band without transactions being taxed. Only transactions effected at exchange rates outside the permissible range would become subject to tax. This would automatically induce stabilizing behavior on the part of market participants."

== Proposals ==
On 15 June 2004 the Belgian Parliament approved a bill implementing a Spahn tax. According to the legislation, Belgium will introduce the Spahn tax once all countries of the eurozone introduce a similar law.

In November 2004, Belgium submitted this law for an opinion to the European Central Bank, which provided both an economic and legal assessment. Its summary stated:

"...the ECB concludes that the economic and monetary usefulness of a tax, such as envisaged by the draft law, is highly questionable, given the uncertainty of its claimed benefits and the likely welfare costs arising from distortions in the working of financial markets. This assessment is reinforced by the difficulties expected with respect to its implementation."

It continued:

"...the ECB is of the opinion that the introduction by a euro area Member State of a tax, such as envisaged by the draft law, is incompatible with the Treaty."

== See also ==
- Bank for International Settlements
- Central banks - which issue currency
- Credit crunch
- Currencies
- Currency crisis
- Currency transaction tax
- Exorbitant privilege
- Financial markets
- Financial transaction tax
- Fluctuation in exchange rates
- Foreign exchange controls
- Foreign exchange derivative
- Foreign exchange market
- Liquidity crisis
- Money market
- Noise (economic)
- Paul Bernd Spahn
- Speculation
- Speculative attack
- Speculation in foreign exchange markets
- Spot market
- Sudden stop (economics)
- Tobin tax
- Transfer tax
- Volatility (finance)
- Volatility risk
- Consequences of currency volatility

=== Related economic crises ===
- 1994 economic crisis in Mexico
- 1997 Asian financial crisis
- 1998 Russian financial crisis
- 1998–2002 Argentine great depression
- 2008 financial crisis
