= Currency crisis =

Type of financial crisis

A currency crisis is a type of financial crisis, and is often associated with a real economic crisis. A currency crisis raises the probability of a banking crisis or a default crisis. During a currency crisis the value of foreign denominated debt will rise drastically relative to the declining value of the home currency. Generally doubt exists as to whether a country's central bank has sufficient foreign exchange reserves to maintain the country's fixed exchange rate, if it has any.

The crisis is often accompanied by a speculative attack in the foreign exchange market. A currency crisis results from chronic balance of payments deficits, and thus is also called a balance of payments crisis. Often such a crisis culminates in a devaluation of the currency. Financial institutions and the government will struggle to meet debt obligations and economic crisis may ensue. Causation also runs the other way. The probability of a currency crisis rises when a country is experiencing a banking or default crisis, while this probability is lower when an economy registers strong GDP growth and high levels of foreign exchange reserves. To offset the damage resulting from a banking or default crisis, a central bank will often increase currency issuance, which can decrease reserves to a point where a fixed exchange rate breaks. The linkage between currency, banking, and default crises increases the chance of twin crises or even triple crises, outcomes in which the economic cost of each individual crisis is enlarged.

Currency crises can be especially destructive to small open economies or bigger, but not sufficiently stable ones. Governments often take on the role of fending off such attacks by satisfying the excess demand for a given currency using the country's own currency reserves or its foreign reserves (usually in the United States dollar, Euro or Pound sterling). Currency crises have large, measurable costs on an economy, but the ability to predict the timing and magnitude of crises is limited by theoretical understanding of the complex interactions between macroeconomic fundamentals, investor expectations, and government policy. A currency crisis may also have political implications for those in power. Following a currency crisis a change in the head of government and a change in the finance minister and/or central bank governor are more likely to occur.

A currency crisis is normally considered as part of a financial crisis. Kaminsky et al. (1998), for instance, define currency crises as when a weighted average of monthly percentage depreciations in the exchange rate and monthly percentage declines in exchange reserves exceeds its mean by more than three standard deviations. Frankel and Rose (1996) define a currency crisis as a nominal depreciation of a currency of at least 25% but it is also defined at least 10% increase in the rate of depreciation. In general, a currency crisis can be defined as a situation when the participants in an exchange market come to recognize that a pegged exchange rate is about to fail, causing speculation against the peg that hastens the failure and forces a devaluation or appreciation.

Recessions attributed to currency crises include the hyperinflation in the Weimar Republic, 1994 economic crisis in Mexico, 1997 Asian financial crisis, 1998 Russian financial crisis, the 1998–2002 Argentine great depression, and the 2016 Venezuela and Turkey currency crises and their corresponding socioeconomic collapse.

== Theories ==
The currency crises and sovereign debt crises that have occurred with increasing frequency since the Latin American debt crisis of the 1980s have inspired a huge amount of research. There have been several 'generations' of models of currency crises.

=== First generation ===
The 'first generation' of models of currency crises began with Paul Krugman's adaptation of Stephen Salant and Dale Henderson's model of speculative attacks in the gold market. In his article, Krugman argues that a sudden speculative attack on a fixed exchange rate, even though it appears to be an irrational change in expectations, can result from rational behavior by investors. This happens if investors foresee that a government is running an excessive deficit, causing it to run short of liquid assets or "harder" foreign currency which it can sell to support its currency at the fixed rate. Investors are willing to continue holding the currency as long as they expect the exchange rate to remain fixed, but they flee the currency en masse when they anticipate that the peg is about to end.

=== Second generation ===
The 'second generation' of models of currency crises starts with the paper of Obstfeld (1986). In these models, doubts about whether the government is willing to maintain its exchange rate peg lead to multiple equilibria, suggesting that self-fulfilling prophecies may be possible. Specifically, investors expect a contingent commitment by the government and if things get bad enough, the peg is not maintained. For example, in the 1992 ERM crisis, the UK was experiencing an economic downturn just as Germany was booming due to the reunification. As a result, the German Bundesbank increased interest rates to slow the expansion. To maintain the peg to Germany, it would have been necessary for the Bank of England to slow the UK economy further by increasing its interest rates as well. As the UK was already in a downturn, increasing interest rates would have increased unemployment further and investors anticipated that the UK politicians were not willing to maintain the peg. As a result, investors attacked the currency and the UK left the peg.

=== Third generation ===
'Third generation' models of currency crises have explored how problems in the banking and financial system interact with currency crises, and how crises can have real effects on the rest of the economy. McKinnon & Pill (1996), Krugman (1998), Corsetti, Pesenti, & Roubini (1998) suggested that "over borrowing" by banks to fund moral hazard lending was a form of hidden government debts (to the extent that governments would bail out failing banks). Radelet & Sachs (1998) suggested that self-fulfilling panics that hit the financial intermediaries, force liquidation of long run assets, which then "confirms" the panics.

Chang and Velasco (2000) argue that a currency crisis may cause a banking crisis if local banks have debts denominated in foreign currency, Burnside, Eichenbaum, and Rebelo (2001 and 2004) argue that a government guarantee of the banking system may give banks an incentive to take on foreign debt, making both the currency and the banking system vulnerable to attack.

Krugman (1999) suggested another two factors, in an attempt to explain the 1997 Asian financial crisis: (1) firms' balance sheets affect their ability to spend, and (2) capital flows affect the real exchange rate. (He proposed his model as "yet another candidate for third generation crisis modeling" (p32)). However, the banking system plays no role in his model.

== Eurozone crisis as a balance-of-payments crisis ==
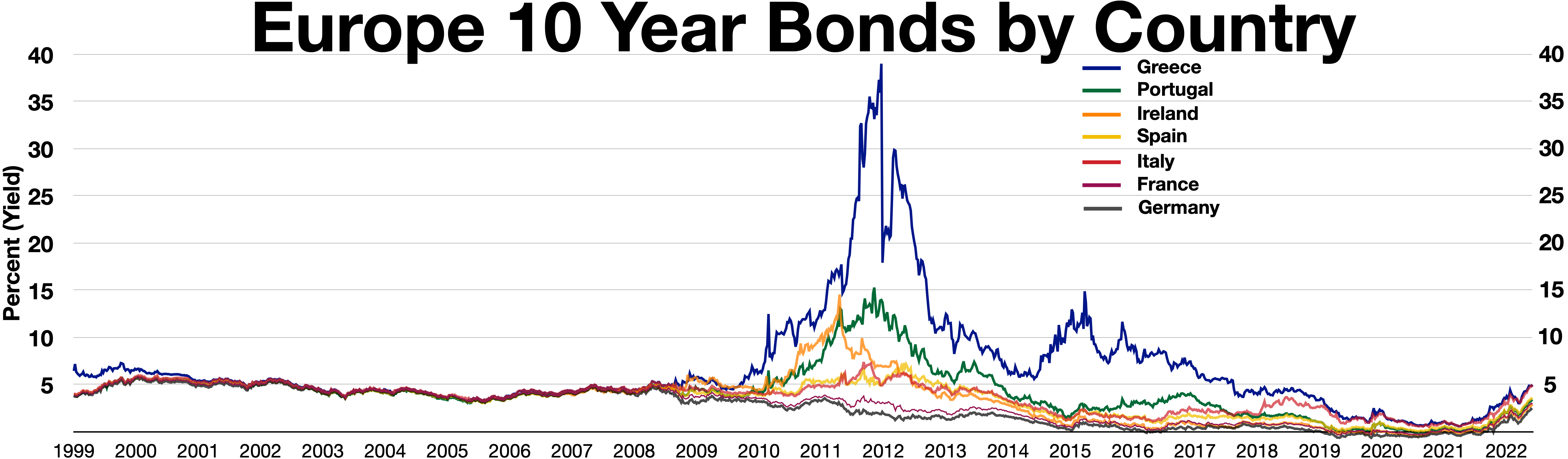
European 10 year bonds, before the Great Recession in Europe bonds floated together in parity Greece 10 year bond Portugal 10 year bond Ireland 10 year bond Spain 10 year bond Italy 10 year bond France 10 year bond Germany 10 year bond

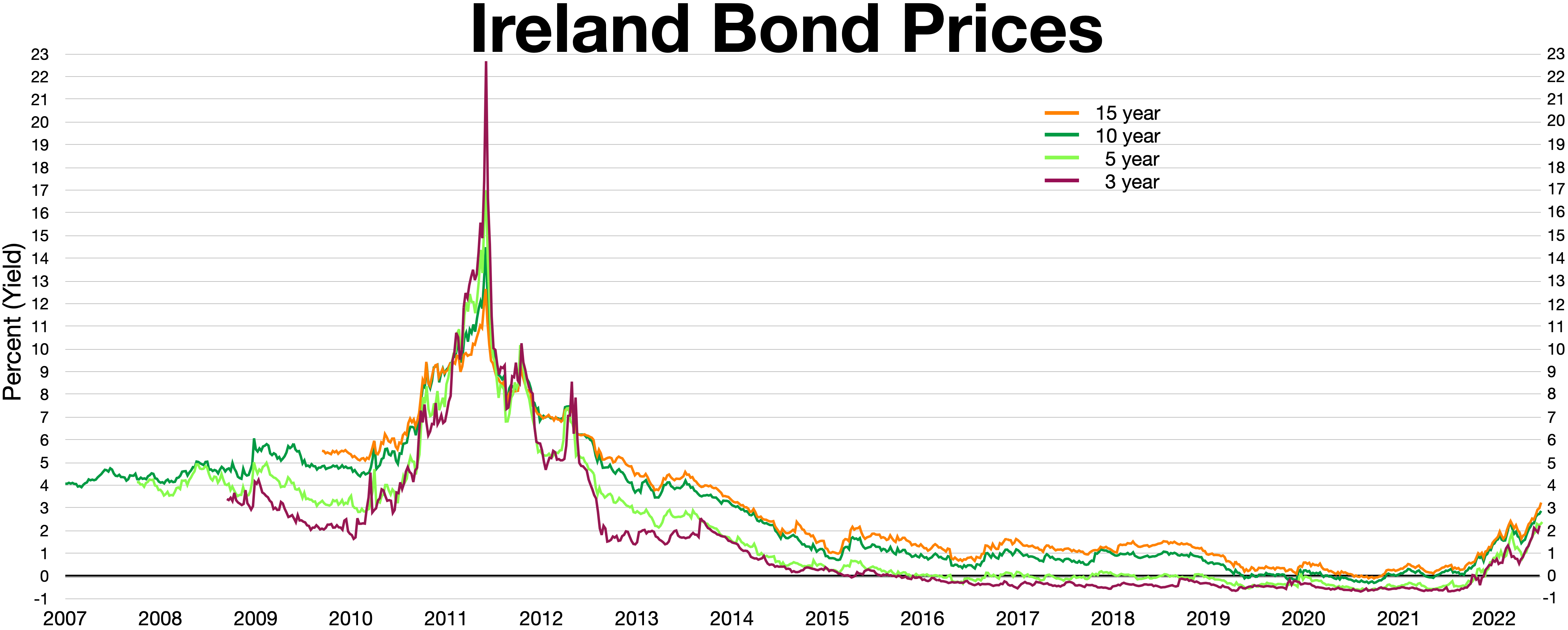
Ireland bond prices, Inverted yield curve in 2011 15 year bond 10 year bond 5 year bond 3 year bond

According to some economists the Eurozone crisis was in fact a balance-of-payments crisis or at least can be thought of as at least as much as a fiscal crisis. According to this view, a capital flow bonanza of private funds took place during the boom years preceding this crisis into countries of Southern Europe or of the periphery of the Eurozone, including Spain, Ireland and Greece; this massive flow financed huge excesses of spending over income, i.e. bubbles, in the private sector, the public sector, or both. The 2008 financial crisis resulted in a sudden stop to these capital inflows that in some cases even led to a total reversal, i.e. a capital flight.

Others, like some of the followers of the Modern Monetary Theory (MMT) school, have argued that a region with its own currency cannot have a balance-of-payments crisis because there exists a mechanism, the TARGET system, that ensures that Eurozone member countries can always fund their current account deficits. These authors do not claim that the current account imbalances in the Eurozone are irrelevant but simply that a currency union cannot have a balance of payments crisis proper. Some authors tackling the crisis from an MMT perspective have claimed that those authors who are denoting the crisis as a 'balance of payments crisis' are changing the meaning of the term.

== See also ==
- Alter-globalization – Advocacy for globalization models prioritizing human rights, environment, and fairness
- ATTAC (Association for the Taxation of Financial Transactions for the Aid of Citizens) – French tax advocacy group
- Central banks - which issue currency – Government body that manages currency and monetary policy
- Currency intervention – Monetary policy operation
- Currency war – Competition between nations to gain competitive advantage by manipulating monetary supply
- Currency transaction tax – Tax on the use of currency
- Debt crisis – Situation in which a government cannot pay back its debt
- Economic collapse – Severe and prolonged economic problems
- Exorbitant privilege – Economic gain by reserve currency nation
- Financial crisis – Situation in which financial assets suddenly lose a large part of their nominal value
- Financial market – Generic term for all markets in which trading takes place with capital
- Financial transaction tax – Tax levied on trades of financial instruments such as stocks, bonds, or derivatives
- Fluctuation in exchange rates – Rate at which one currency will be exchanged for another
- Foreign exchange controls – Controls imposed by a government on the purchase/sale of foreign currencies
- Foreign exchange market – Global decentralized trading of international currencies
- Global Justice Movement – Network of organized efforts around international justice
- Jubilee 2000 – International movement to cancel third world debt by the year 2000
- Liquidity crisis – Acute shortage of liquidity
- Money market – Type of financial market providing short-term funds
- Paul Bernd Spahn – German economist (1939–2025)
- Spahn tax – Type of currency transaction tax
- Speculation – Engaging in risky financial transactions
- Speculative attack – Concept in economics
- Sudden stop (economics)
- Speculation in foreign exchange markets – Global decentralized trading of international currencies
- Tobin tax – Proposed tax on currency transactions to reduce speculation and volatility

=== Related economic crises ===
- Bretton Woods system § U.S. balance of payments crisis (1960s)
- Mexican peso crisis
- 1997 Asian financial crisis
- 1998 Russian financial crisis
- 1998–2002 Argentine great depression
- 2008 financial crisis
