= Currency transaction tax =

Tax on the use of currency

A currency transaction tax is a tax placed on the use of currency for various types of transactions. The tax is associated with the financial sector and is a type of financial transaction tax, as opposed to a consumption tax paid by consumers, though the tax may be passed on by the financial institution to the customer.

== Types of currency transaction taxes ==
Currency transaction taxes have been proposed as taxes on domestic currency usage as part of the automated payment transaction (APT) tax and on international currency transactions, the Tobin tax and the Spahn tax.

=== APT tax ===
The automated payment transaction (APT) tax was first proposed in Buenos Aires at the International Institute of Public Finance Conference by Edgar L. Feige in 1989 and an extended version of the proposal appeared in Economic Policy in 2000. The APT tax proposal is a generalization of the Keynes tax and the Tobin tax. The APT tax consists of a small flat tax levied on all transactions. The tax is automatically assessed and collected when transactions are settled through the electronic technology of the banking or payments system. In order to assure that all cash transactions are also taxed, the APT system proposes to exact a tax on currency as it enters and leaves the banking system. In order to be an effective means of discouraging currency usage for tax evasion, the APT tax imposes a tax rate on currency higher than the rate automatically charged on cheque transactions. Since cash can be used multiple times between the time it enters into circulation and the time it is returned to the banking system, the APT currency transaction tax is set at a multiple of the rate charged for all other transactions using non cash payment methods.

=== Tobin tax ===
A Tobin tax is a tax on all spot conversions of one currency into another. Named after the economist James Tobin, the tax is intended to put a penalty on short-term financial round-trip excursions into another currency. Tobin suggested his currency transaction tax in 1972 in his Janeway Lectures at Princeton, shortly after the Bretton Woods system effectively ended.

=== Spahn tax ===
In 1995, Paul Bernd Spahn suggested an alternative involving "a two-tier rate structure consisting of a low-rate financial transactions tax, plus an exchange surcharge at prohibitive rates as a piggyback. The latter would be dormant in times of normal financial activities, and be activated only in the case of speculative attacks. The mechanism allowing the identification of abnormal trading in world financial markets would make reference to a "crawling peg" with an appropriate exchange rate band. The exchange rate would move freely within this band without transactions being taxed. Only transactions effected at exchange rates outside the permissible range would become subject to tax. This would automatically induce stabilizing behavior on the part of market participants."

On June 15, 2004, the Commission of Finance and Budget in the Belgian Federal Parliament approved a bill implementing a Spahn tax. According to the legislation, Belgium will introduce the Spahn tax once all countries of the eurozone introduce a similar law. In July 2005 former Austrian chancellor Wolfgang Schüssel called for a European Union Tobin tax which he thought would base the community's financial structure on more stable and independent grounds. However, the proposal was rejected by the European Commission.

=== Special Drawing Rights ===
On September 19, 2001, retired speculator George Soros put forward a proposal, special drawing rights or SDRs that the rich countries would pledge for the purpose of providing international assistance, without necessarily dismissing the Tobin tax idea. He stated, "I think there is a case for a Tobin tax... (but) it is not at all clear to me that a Tobin tax would reduce volatility in the currency markets. It is true that it may discourage currency speculation but it would also reduce the liquidity of the marketplace."

== Evaluation ==
=== Impacts ===
In 1994, Canadian economist Rodney Schmidt noted that "in two-thirds of all the outright forward and currency swap transactions, the money moved into another currency for fewer than seven days. In only 1 per cent did the money stay for as long as one year. While the volatile exchange rates caused by all this rapid movement posed problems for national economies, it was the bread and butter of those playing the currency markets. Without constant fluctuations in the currency markets, Schmidt noted, there was little opportunity for profit."

"This certainly seemed to suggest the interests of currency traders and the interests of ordinary citizens were operating at cross-purposes."

"Schmidt also noted another interesting aspect of the foreign- exchange market: The dominant players were the private banks, which had huge pools of capital and access to information about currency values. Since much of the market involved moving large sums of money (typically in the tens of millions of dollars) for very short periods of time (often less than a day), banks were perfectly positioned to participate. Among swap transactions, which represented a major chunk of the foreign exchange market, 86 per cent of the transactions were actually between banks."

A representative of a “pro Tobin tax” NGO argued as follows: "[The Tobin tax] is designed to reduce the power financial markets have to determine the economic policies of national governments. Traditionally, a country’s central bank buys and sells its own currency on international markets to keep its value relatively stable. The bank buys back its currency when a ‘glut’ caused by an investor selloff threatens to reduce the currency's value. In the past, most central banks had enough cash in reserve to offset any selloff or ‘attack’. However, this is no longer the case. Speculators now have more cash than all the world's central banks put together. Official global reserves are less than half the value of one day of global foreign-exchange turnover. Many countries are simply unable to protect their currencies from speculative attack."

"By cutting down on the overall volume of foreign-exchange transactions, a Tobin Tax would mean that central banks would not need as much reserve money to defend their currency. The tax would allow governments the freedom to act in the best interests of their own economic development, rather than being forced to shape fiscal and monetary policies according to demands of fickle financial markets."

== Implementation of Tobin tax ==
In early November 2007, a regional Tobin tax was adopted by the Bank of the South in Latin America, after an initiative of Presidents Hugo Chavez from Venezuela and Néstor Kirchner from Argentina.

== Chronology ==
- 1972 - Supporter: James Tobin, author of a "tax on foreign exchange transactions", which was later dubbed "Tobin tax"
- June, 2000 - Thomas Palley publishes "Destabilizing Speculation and the Case for an International Currency Transactions Tax"
- April 1, 2001 - Supporters: Peter Wahl and Peter Waldow publish "Currency Transaction Tax - a Concept with a Future"
- In 2001 the charity War on Want released The Robin Hood Tax, a report presenting their case for a currency transactions tax. War on Want also sets up the Tobin Tax Network to develop the proposal and press for its introduction.
- September, 2006 - The term "currency transaction tax (CTT)" was used in a publication by Stephen Spratt
- October, 2007 - Rodney Schmidt publishes The Currency Transaction Tax: Rate and Revenue Estimates

== See also ==
- ATTAC (Association for the Taxation of Financial Transactions for the Aid of Citizens)
- Bank for International Settlements
- Bank tax
- Central banks - which issue currency
- Credit crunch
- Currencies
- Currency crisis
- Currency transaction report
- Exorbitant privilege
- Financial markets
- Financial transaction tax
- Fluctuation in exchange rates
- Foreign exchange controls
- Foreign exchange derivative
- Foreign exchange market
- Liquidity crisis
- Money market
- Noise (economic)
- Paul Bernd Spahn
- Robin Hood Tax
- Spahn tax
- Speculation
- Speculative attack
- Speculation in foreign exchange markets
- Spot market
- Sudden stop (economics)
- Tax on cash withdrawal
- Tobin tax
- Transfer tax
- Volatility (finance)
- Volatility risk
- Consequences of currency volatility
- 1990s work of War on Want

Related economic crises

- 1994 economic crisis in Mexico
- 1997 Asian financial crisis
- 1998 Russian financial crisis
- 1998–2002 Argentine great depression
- 2008 financial crisis
