= Transfer tax =

Tax on the transfer of property or assets between parties

A transfer tax is a tax on the passing of title to property from one person (or entity) to another.

In a narrow legal sense, a transfer tax is essentially a transaction fee imposed on the transfer of title to property from one entity to another. This kind of tax is typically imposed where there is a legal requirement for registration of the transfer, such as transfers of real estate, shares, or bond. Examples of such taxes include some forms of stamp duty, real estate transfer tax, and levies for the formal registration of a transfer. In some jurisdictions, transfers of certain forms of property require confirmation by a notary. While notarial fees may add to the cost of the transaction, they are not a transfer tax in the strict sense of the term.

== UK ==
In England and Northern Ireland, property transfers between living persons or other legal entities incur a Stamp Duty Land Tax. Similar provisions exist in Scotland and Wales.

When property is transferred from the estate of a deceased person, Inheritance tax is payable on the value of the estate including any property portfolio in that estate, subject to a minimum value threshold.

== United States ==
In some states, transfer tax is considered to be an excise tax. Transfer taxes can be levied at the federal, state and local levels, depending on the type of property being transferred.

== Real estate ==
Real estate transfer tax can be appointed by the authorities of state, county or commune when a real estate property is being transferred within a certain jurisdiction. Subjected to the tax is usually the act of transfer of legal deeds, certificates and titles to a property that are being shifted between the seller and the buyer. The size of the tax is derived from value of the certain property, its classification and from how the property is going to be used, because the purpose of a property can often greatly affect its future value. Therefore, local and state government are permitted to collect the tax based not only on the size of a property, but also its intended purpose. Classification of properties allows states to put different taxes on different properties in a non-uniform manner. The different classifications are commonly based on either use or ownership. There are two main ways that a state uses to tax in a non-uniform manner and those are by imposing different rates of tax on different types of property, or a uniform rate of tax but giving different types of property a different percentage of value. In some states the buyer may be required to pay the tax if the seller either isn't able to pay themselves or is liberated from it. In the United States, the term transfer tax also refers to Estate tax and Gift tax. Both these taxes levy a charge on the transfer of property from a person (or that person's estate) to another without consideration. In 1900, the United States Supreme Court in the case of Knowlton v. Moore, 178 U.S. 41 (1900), confirmed that the estate tax was a tax on the transfer of property as a result of a death and not a tax on the property itself. The taxpayer argued that the estate tax was a direct tax and that, since it had not been apportioned among the states according to population, it was unconstitutional. The Court ruled that the estate tax, as a transfer tax (and not a tax on property by reason of its ownership) was an indirect tax. In the wake of Knowlton the Internal Revenue Code of the United States continues to refer to the Estate tax and the related Gift tax as "Transfer taxes."

The real estate tax is not imposed by five of the United States of America and those are Mississippi, Missouri, New Mexico, North Dakota, and Wyoming.

In this broader sense, estate tax, gift tax, capital gains tax, sales tax on goods (not services), and certain use taxes are all transfer taxes because they involve a tax on the transfer of title.

The United States had a tax on sales or transfers of stock from 1914 to 1966. This was instituted in The Revenue Act of 1914 (Act of Oct. 22, 1914 (ch. 331, 38 Stat. 745)), in the amount of 0.02% (2 basis points, bips). This was doubled to 0.04% (4 bips) in 1932, in the context of the Great Depression, then eliminated in 1966.

== See also ==
- Currency transaction tax – Tax on the use of currency
- Financial transaction tax – Tax levied on trades of financial instruments such as stocks, bonds, or derivatives
- Inheritance tax – Tax paid after inheritance of property
- Spahn tax – Type of currency transaction tax
- Stamp duty – Tax levied on property purchases or documents
- Stamp duty in the United Kingdom – Tax charged on legal instruments
- Tobin tax – Proposed tax on currency transactions to reduce speculation and volatility
- Turnover tax – Indirect tax on goods purchases
