= Speculative attack =

Concept in economics

In economics, a speculative attack is a precipitous selling of untrustworthy assets by previously inactive speculators and the corresponding acquisition of some valuable assets (currencies, gold). The first model of a speculative attack was contained in a 1975 discussion paper on the gold market by Stephen Salant and Dale Henderson at the Federal Reserve Board. Paul Krugman, who visited the Board as a graduate student intern, soon adapted their mechanism to explain speculative attacks in the foreign exchange market.

There are now many hundreds of journal articles on financial speculative attacks, which are typically grouped into three categories: first, second, and third generation models. Salant has continued to explore real speculative attacks in a series of six articles.

== How it works ==
A speculative attack in the foreign exchange market is the massive and sudden selling of a nation's currency, and can be carried out by both domestic and foreign investors. A speculative attack primarily targets currencies of nations that use a fixed exchange rate and have pegged their currency to a foreign currency, such as Hong Kong pegging the Hong Kong Dollar (HK$) to the United States Dollar (US$) at an exchange rate of HK$7.8 to US$1; generally the target currency is one whose fixed exchange rate may be at an unrealistic level that may not be sustainable for very much longer even in the absence of a speculative attack. In order to maintain a fixed exchange rate, the nation's central bank stands ready to buy back its own currency at the fixed exchange rate, paying with its holdings of foreign exchange reserves.

If foreign or domestic investors believe that the central bank does not hold enough foreign reserves to defend the fixed exchange rate, they will target this nation's currency for a speculative attack. The investors do this by selling that country's currency to the central bank at the fixed price in exchange for the central bank's reserve currency, in an attempt to deplete the central bank's foreign reserves. Once the central bank runs out of foreign reserves, it no longer is able to purchase its currency at the fixed exchange rate and is forced to allow the currency to float. This often leads to the sudden depreciation of the currency. As many large nations have massive amounts of foreign reserves, often referred to as war chests, speculative attacks often target smaller nations with smaller war chests as they are easier to deplete.

== How speculators profit ==
There are two main ways that domestic and foreign investors can profit from speculative attacks. Investors can either take out a loan in the nation and exchange the loan for a foreign currency at the fixed exchange rate or short the stocks of the nation prior to the sudden depreciation of the currency.

Taking out a loan allows the investor to borrow a large sum of money from the nation's central bank and convert the money at the fixed exchange rate into a foreign currency. As the massive outflow depletes the war chest or forces the nation to abandon the fixed exchange rate, investors are able to convert their foreign currency back at a significantly higher rate.

For example, an investor borrows 100X and converts it to 100Y at the fixed exchange rate of 1X to 1Y. If the nation X runs out of foreign reserve Y in this period or if they are forced to allow their currency to float, the value of X may drop to an exchange rate of 2X to 1Y. Investors can then exchange their 100Y for 200X, allowing them to pay off the loan of 100X and maintaining a profit of 100X.

An example of this can be seen in the United Kingdom prior to the implementation of the euro when European countries used a fixed exchange rate amongst the nations. The Bank of England had an interest rate that was too low while Germany had a relatively higher interest rate. Speculators increasingly borrowed money from the Bank of England and converted the money into the German mark at the fixed exchange rate. The demand for sterling dropped so much that the exchange rate was no longer able to be maintained and sterling depreciated suddenly. Investors were then able to convert their German marks back into sterling at a significantly higher rate, allowing them to pay off their loans and keep large profits.

Shorting stocks also takes advantage of the depreciation of the currency following a speculative attack. Investors sell their stock with the agreement that they will purchase it back after a certain number of days, whether it increases or decreases in value. If an investor shorts their stock prior to the speculative attack and subsequent depreciation, the investor will then purchase the stock at a significantly lower price. The difference between the value of the stock when it was sold and when it was repurchased is the profit that the investor makes. Examples of this can be seen when George Soros shorted Thailand stocks prior to the speculative attack that led to the Asian Financial Crisis in 1997 and the shorting of Hong Kong stocks during the failed speculative attack in 1998.

== Risks for speculators ==
A speculative attack has much in common with cornering the market, as it involves building up a large directional position in the hope of exiting at a better price. As such, it runs the same risk: a speculative attack relies entirely on the market reacting to the attack by continuing the move that has been engineered for profits to be made by the attackers. In a market that is not susceptible, the reaction of the market may instead be to take advantage of the price change, by taking opposing positions and reversing the engineered move.

Doing so may be assisted by aggressive intervention by a central bank directly, by very large currency transactions or raising interest rates, or indirectly, by another central bank with an interest in preserving the current exchange rate. As in cornering the market, attackers are left vulnerable.

== See also ==
- Black Wednesday, in which a speculative attack on the pound sterling resulted in a forced withdrawal from the Exchange Rate Mechanism, a system of fixed exchange rates in the EU.
- Currency transaction tax
- Currency crisis
- Financial transaction tax
- Spahn tax
- Speculation
- Tobin tax
