= Exchange controls in the United Kingdom =

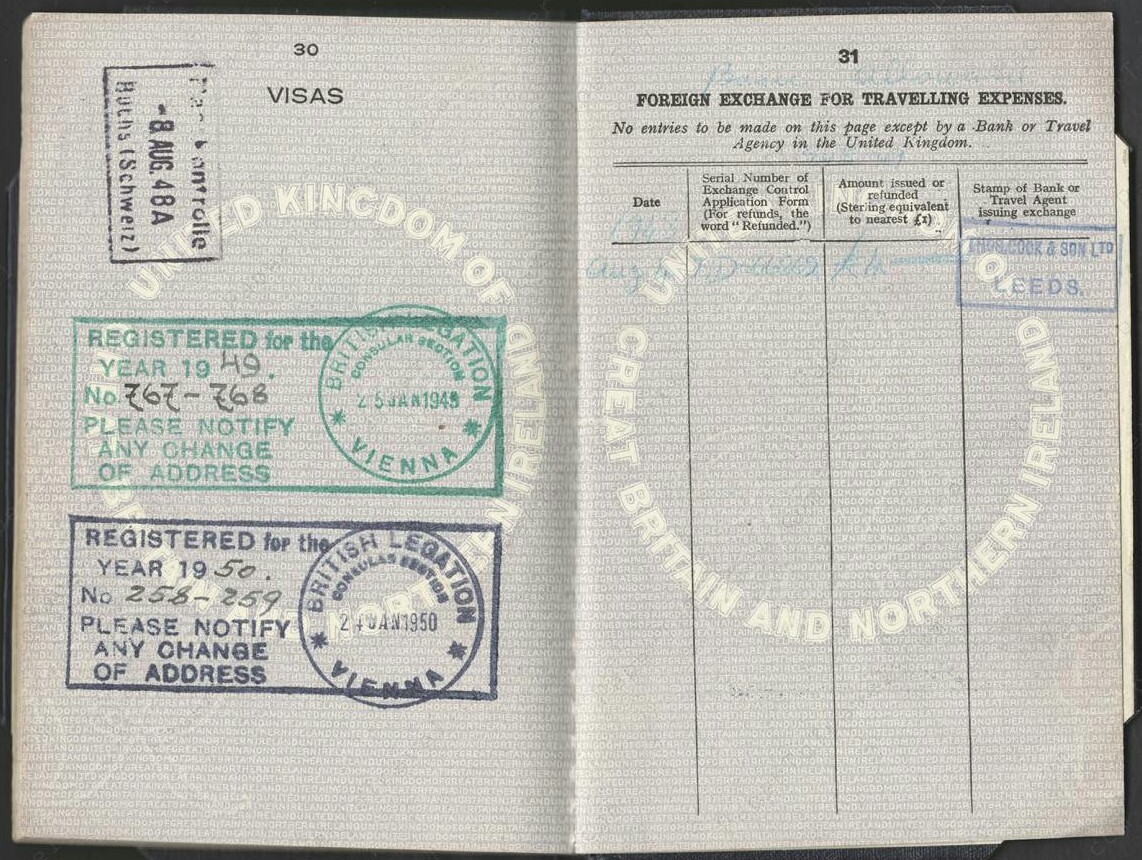
Foreign Exchange for Travelling Expenses, without Exchange Control Act, 1947 notation, Issued 1948-03-05 (Pages 30 and 31)

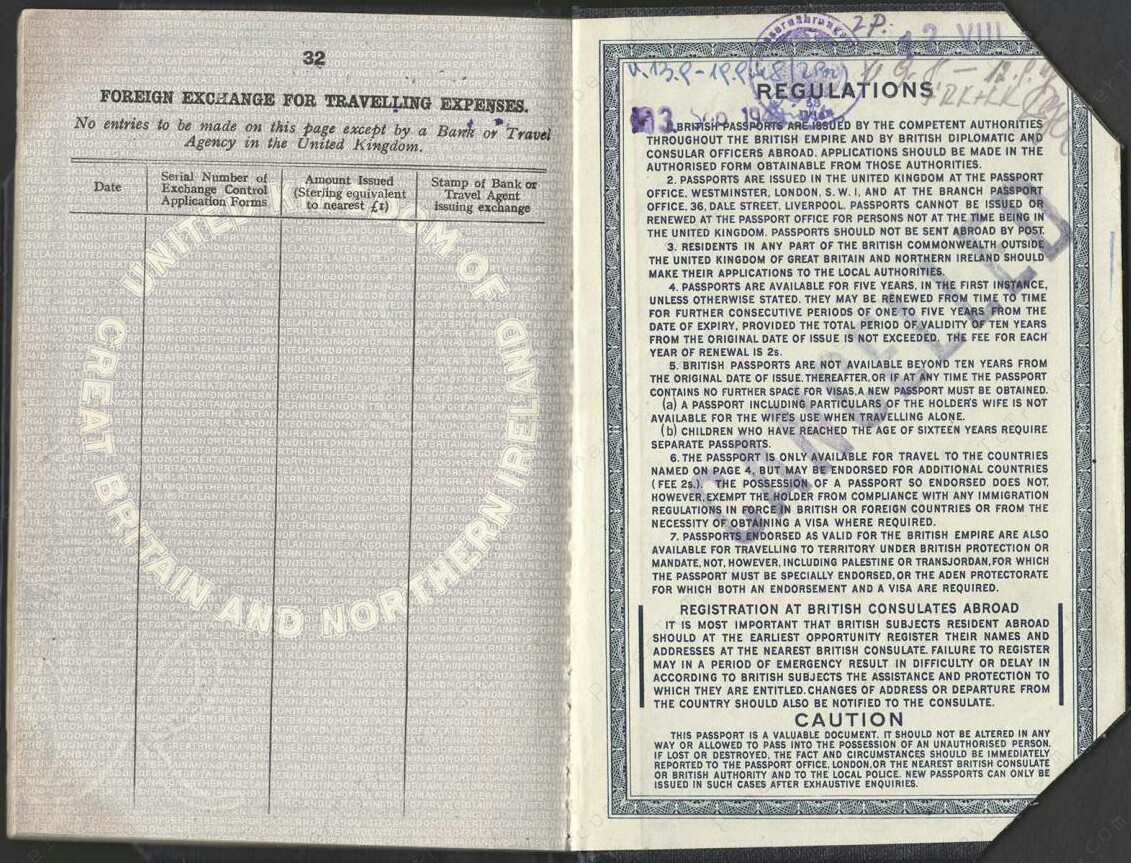
Foreign Exchange for Travelling Expenses, without Exchange Control Act, 1947 notation, Issued 1948-03-05 (Pages 32 and Regulations)

Although issued after the Exchange Control Act, 1947 (March 11), existing stock probably still existed and were issued

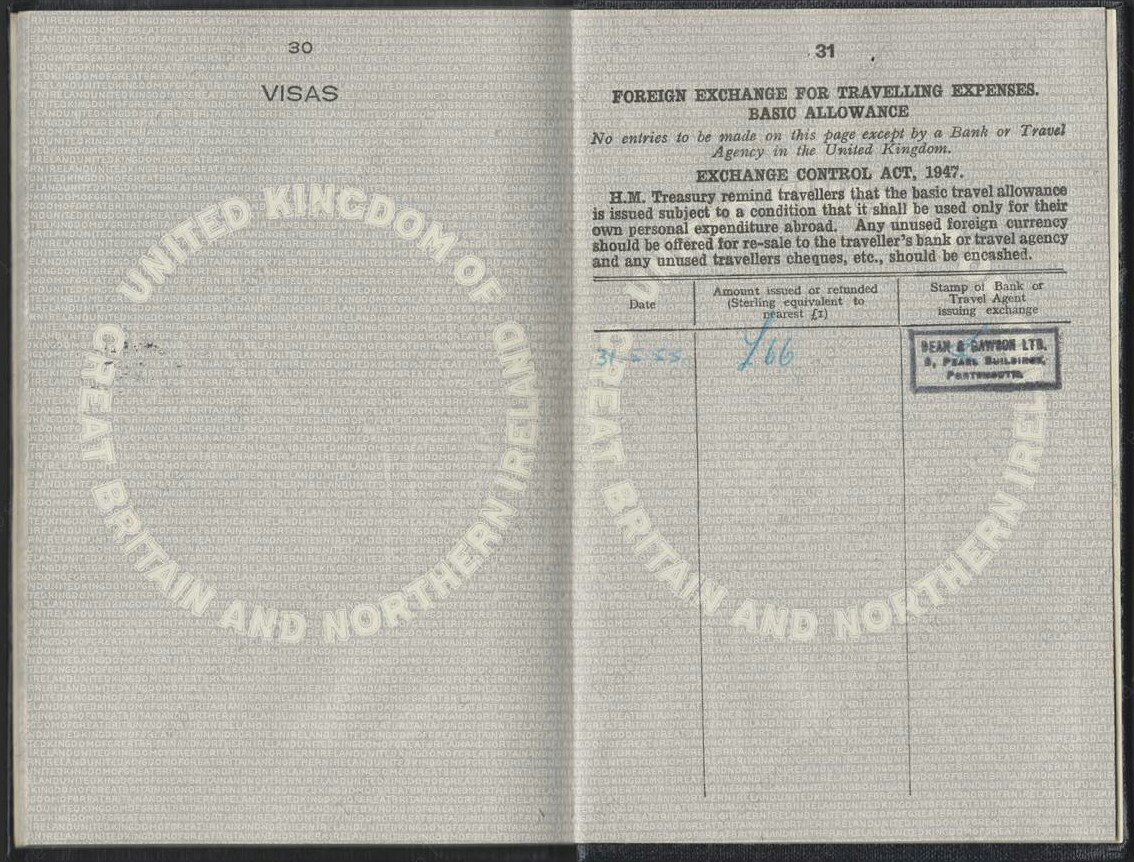
Foreign Exchange for Travelling Expenses, Basic Allowance, Issued 1955-05-25 (Pages 30 and 31)

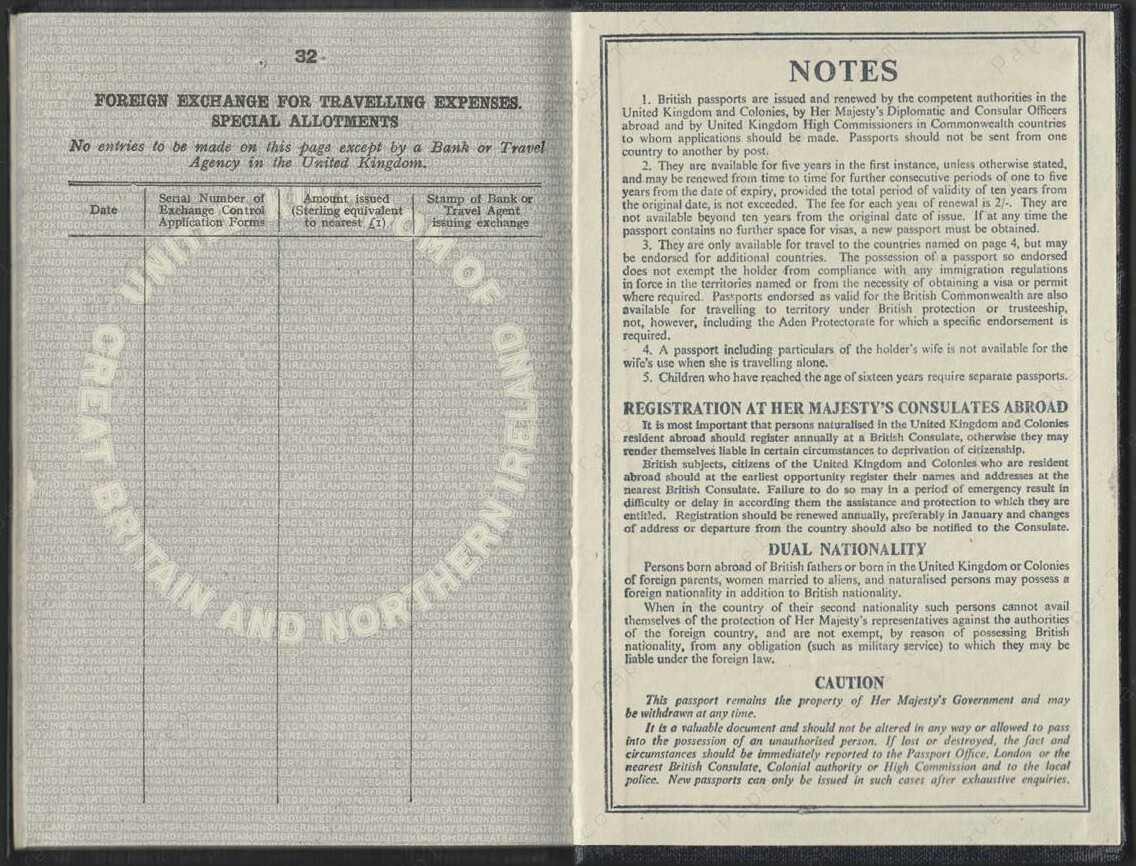
Foreign Exchange for Travelling Expenses, Special Allotments, Issued 1955-05-25 (Pages 32 and Notes)

With Exchange Control Act, 1947 and Basic Allowance or Special Allotments notation

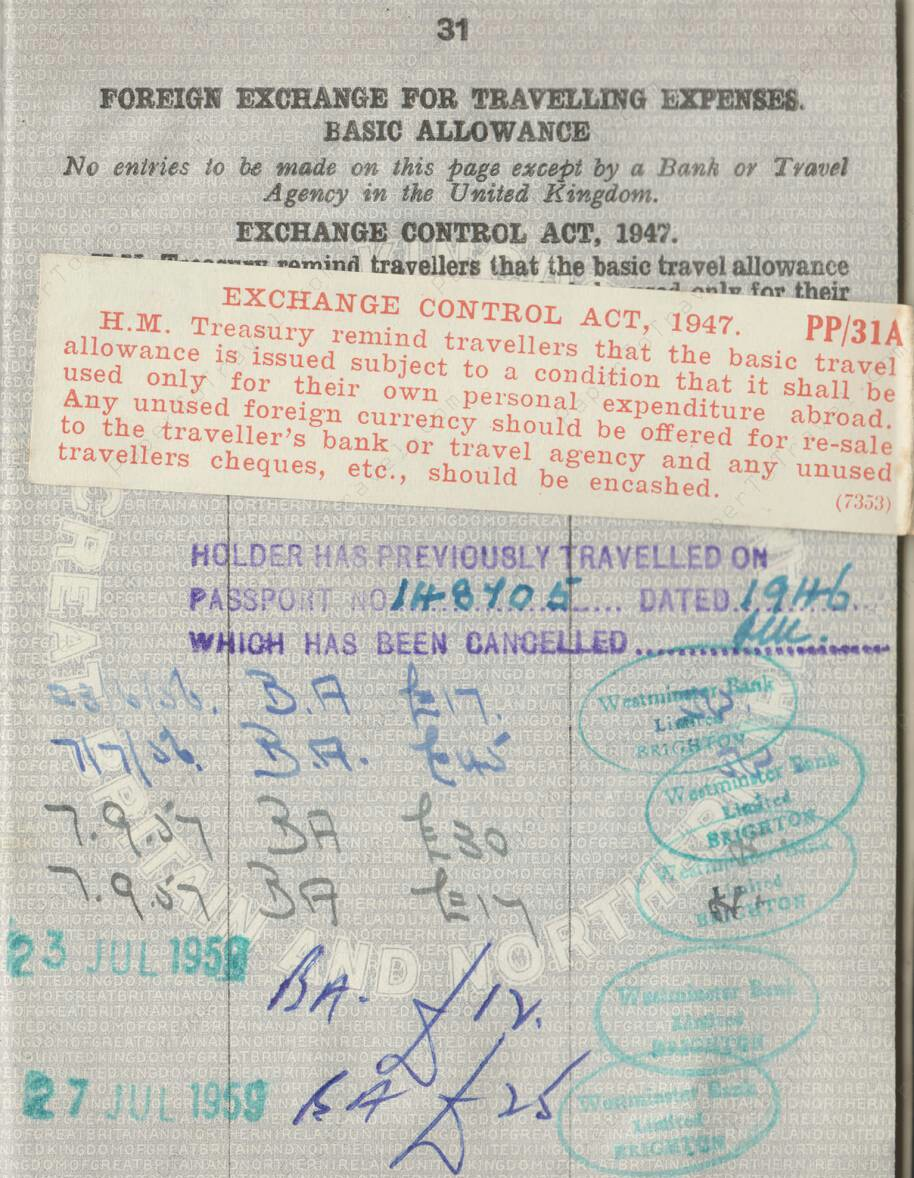
Foreign Exchange for Travelling Expenses, Basic Allowance, with Exchange Control Act, 1947 notation, Issued 1956-04-10 (Page 31)

With Exchange Control Act, 1947 and Basic Allowance notation, with PP/31A sticker, previous passport number and year of issue stamped

Exchange controls, also known as capital controls and currency controls, limiting the convertibility of Pounds sterling into foreign currencies, operated within the United Kingdom from the outbreak of war in 1939 until they were abolished by the Conservative Government of Prime Minister Margaret Thatcher in October 1979.

== History ==
Exchange controls were originally enacted at the outbreak of war in 1939, to prevent a run on sterling, and to prevent any potential panic outflow of capital from the UK. The Defence (Finance) Regulations, issued under the Emergency Powers (Defence) Act 1939, provided for restrictions on the convertibility of sterling into foreign currencies, such as US dollars.

These powers were formalised after the war in 1947, in the Exchange Control Act. As long as exchange controls remained in place, the amount of money British citizens could take out of the UK was severely limited. British passports contained a final page titled "Exchange Control Act 1947” in which foreign currency exchanges had to be listed, the amounts permitted being capped at low levels. In addition, British citizens were no longer free to invest in overseas assets such as foreign shares or property.

In 1966 the Labour Government of Prime Minister Harold Wilson restricted the amount of currency that British holidaymakers could take out of the country to £50 plus £15 in sterling cash. However, the controls were widely flouted.

=== Abolition ===
Exchange controls in the UK were abolished by the Conservative Government of Prime Minister Margaret Thatcher in October 1979. Announcing their removal, Chancellor of the Exchequer Geoffrey Howe said: "They have now outlived their usefulness. The essential condition for maintaining confidence in our currency is a Government determined to maintain the right monetary and fiscal policies. That we shall do. It is right to give an additional degree of freedom to allow the pound to operate in the world unrestricted by restraints of this kind.”

Abolition was welcomed by business, and criticised by the opposition Labour Party. Nicholas Goodison, chairman of the London Stock Exchange, said that exchange controls had “impeded the development of British commerce throughout the world and so distorted our economy. They have done a lot of harm to London as one of the leading financial centres.” Conversely, the abolition of exchange controls was criticised by Labour's Shadow Chancellor Denis Healey, who warned of the danger of increased foreign investment at the expense of British industry.

== Exchange controls today ==
Today there are no exchange controls restricting the transfer of funds into or out of the United Kingdom. However, any person carrying the equivalent of €10,000 or more in cash when they enter or leave the UK must declare it to customs officers at the border.

At the 2017 Labour Party annual conference, Shadow Chancellor John McDonnell hinted at the possibility of a return of exchange controls should there be a run on the pound following a Labour election victory.

The Green Party of England and Wales say in paragraph EC665 of their Economy Policy, last amended in 2019, that '... A Green government would work in Europe and globally to re-establish controls on international capital movements, in order to restore financial stability and regain control over the macro- economy'.

== See also ==
- Economic history of the United Kingdom
- Economy of the United Kingdom
- Sterling area
