= Tax on cash withdrawal =

Form of advance taxation

Tax on cash withdrawal is a form of advance taxation and is a strategy to keep tax evasion in check. This mode of tax collection is also called the presumptive tax regime. Globally, 3 countries are known to consider this approach namely, Pakistan, India and Greece.

== Greece - Cashpoint ==
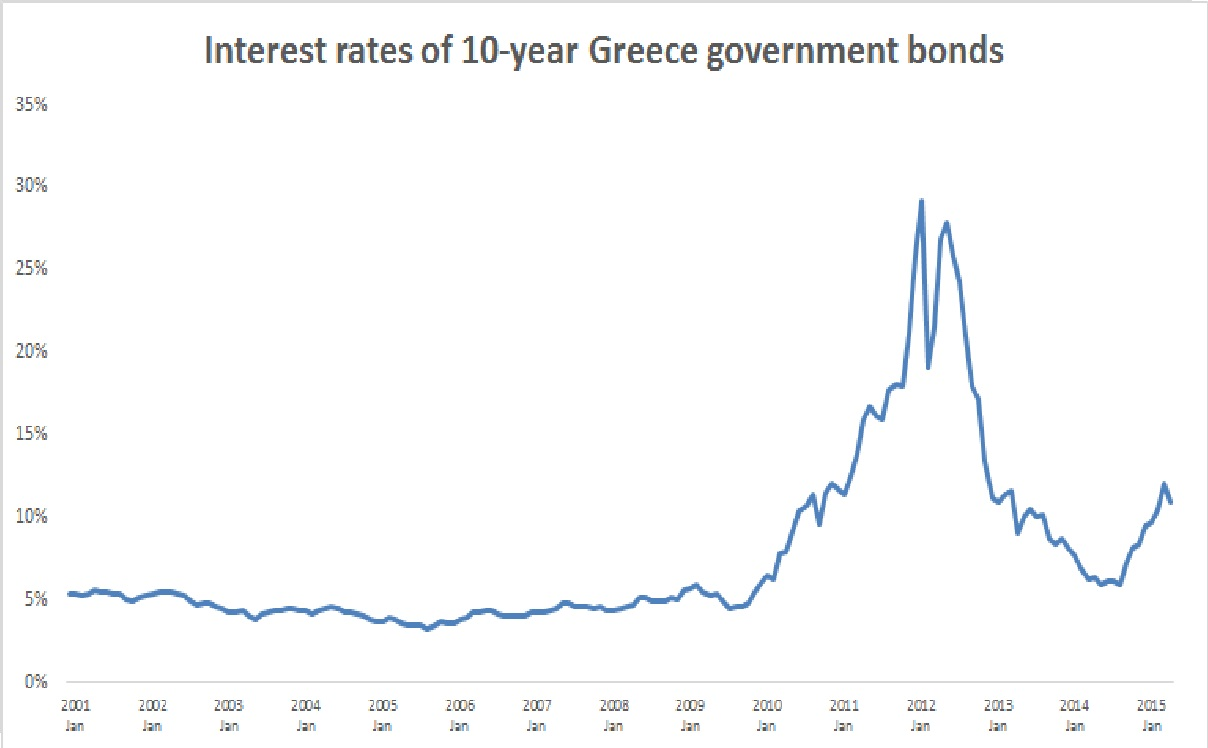
10-year Greece government bonds

During 2015, when Greek economy was on the verge of bankruptcy, millions of panicked citizens completely cleared their accounts - by pulling more than €28 billion out of banks and pushing the total cash revenue held in the country's financial institutions to a 10-year low.

To combat this Greek banks proposed taxing cash withdrawals and requiring use of debit and credit cards for all transaction in order to prevent tax evasion. A surcharge for all cashpoint withdrawals was introduced approximately amounting to €1 for every €1,000 transaction. It was expected that it won't impact day-to-day withdrawals and it will deter citizens from clearing out their bank accounts.

Ministers of the Athens government hoped the move could raise as much as €180 million, which would have helped the country's the then debt conditions. As per bank officials, cash was easy to funnel into the underground economy, which cost the state an estimated loss of 15 billion euros ($15.88 billion) a year and it would stop if there were no cash.

Greece declared bankruptcy in 2015.

== Pakistan - Tax on Cash Withdrawals ==
In Pakistan, banking companies are required to deduct an advance adjustable tax at a rate of 0.8% on cash withdrawals exceeding fifty thousand rupees per day. This tax applies to individuals whose names are not listed as active taxpayers. The total amount withdrawn in a single day is considered for determining whether the threshold has been met. For reference purpose original section is mentioned below.

231AB. Advance tax on cash withdrawal.: (1) Every banking company shall deduct advance adjustable tax at the rate of 0.8% of the cash withdrawal from a person whose name is not appearing in the active taxpayers’ list on the sum total of the payments for cash withdrawal in a day, exceeding fifty thousand rupees.

Explanation: For removal of doubt, it is clarified that the said fifty thousand rupees shall be aggregate cash withdrawals in a single day.

Section 231AB was insert in Income Tax Ordinance by Finance Act 2023. Previously Withholding Tax on Cash Withdrawals was imposed via Section 231A omitted by the Finance Act, 2021.

The omitted section read as follows:

231A. Cash withdrawal from a bank. (1) Every banking company shall deduct tax at the rate specified in Division VI of Part IV of the First Schedule, if the payment for cash withdrawal, or the sum total of the payments for cash withdrawal in a day, exceeds fifty thousand rupees.

Explanation: For removal of doubt, it is clarified that the said fifty thousand rupees shall be aggregate withdrawals from all the bank accounts in a single day.

Karachi residents have contributed Rs 10 billion to the FBR's tax revenue in the past ten months through a new tax on bank cash withdrawals.

== India - Banking Transaction Tax (BTT) ==
From 2005 to 2008, the UPA led government of India imposed tax on withdrawals of more than Rs 50,000.00 from current accounts for detection of unaccounted money in the absence of alternative methods. This tax was applicable only on cash and not on payment by cheques. Jaswant Singh, a former BJP leader criticized this taxation stating this could cause inconvenience to people. This criticism was rejected by the then finance minister P Chidambaram, who later passed the bill to withdraw this form of taxation in 2009.

During 2014 elections, BJP while preparing the vision document named India Vision 2025, under the helmsmanship of former party President Nitin Gadkari stated they were looking forward to bring tax reforms. Economic think-tank Arthakranti during 2014 recommended the BJP led government to abolish the present taxation mechanism (income tax) and replace it with the Banking Transaction Tax (BTT) thereby charging a 2-4% of transaction tax on every form of transaction including electronic and cheque payments. Economic times criticized BTT stating it was "regressive and iniquitous" and it "could push India further back" citing reasons of a parallel economy where the poor and the rich will have to pay the equivalent amount of taxes.

Section under Income Tax Act, 1961 was introduced by the Indian Government in Union budget 2019–2020. It was enforced in the same financial year but later amendments were made and clarifications regarding this provision were made by CBDT (central board of direct taxes). This new law on TDS on cash withdrawal has come into effect from July 1, 2020.

As per the provisions of section 194N of Income Tax Act, if a person withdraws more than 1 Crore from the specific payers, then the payers will deduct TDS on such transaction and deposit it.

== See also ==
- Bank transaction tax
- Currency transaction tax
- Taxation in Pakistan
