= Tobin tax =

Proposed tax on currency transactions to reduce speculation and volatility

A Tobin tax was originally defined as a tax on all spot conversions of one currency into another. It was suggested by James Tobin, an economist who won the Nobel Memorial Prize in Economic Sciences. Tobin's tax was originally intended to penalize short-term financial round-trip excursions into another currency. By the late 1990s, the term Tobin tax was being applied to all forms of short term transaction taxation, whether across currencies or not. The concept of the Tobin tax is being picked up by various tax proposals currently being discussed, amongst them the European Union Financial Transaction Tax as well as the Robin Hood tax.

== Original proposal ==
Tobin suggested his currency transaction tax in 1972 in his Janeway Lectures at Princeton, shortly after the Bretton Woods system of monetary management ended in 1971. Prior to 1971, one of the chief features of the Bretton Woods system was an obligation for each country to adopt a monetary policy that maintained the exchange rate of its currency within a fixed value—plus or minus one percent—in terms of gold. Then, on August 15, 1971, United States President Richard Nixon announced that the United States dollar would no longer be convertible to gold, effectively ending the system. This action created the situation whereby the U.S. dollar became the sole backing of currencies and a reserve currency for the member states of the Bretton Woods system, leading the system to collapse in the face of increasing financial strain in that same year. In that context, Tobin suggested a new system for international currency stability, and proposed that such a system include an international charge on foreign-exchange transactions.

In 2001, in another context, just after "the 90s' crises in Mexico, Southeast Asia and Russia," which included the 1994 economic crisis in Mexico, the 1997 Asian financial crisis, and the 1998 Russian financial crisis, Tobin summarized his idea:

The tax on foreign exchange transactions was devised to cushion exchange rate fluctuations. The idea is very simple: at each exchange of a currency into another a small tax would be levied - let's say, 0.5% of the volume of the transaction. This dissuades speculators as many investors invest their money in foreign exchange on a very short-term basis. If this money is suddenly withdrawn, countries have to drastically increase interest rates for their currency to still be attractive. But high interest is often disastrous for a national economy, as the nineties' crises in Mexico, Southeast Asia and Russia have proven. My tax would return some margin of maneuver to issuing banks in small countries and would be a measure of opposition to the dictate of the financial markets.

Though James Tobin suggested the rate as 0.5%, in that interview setting, others have tried to be more precise in their search for the optimum rate.

Economic literature of the period 1990s-2000s emphasized that variations in the terms of payment in trade-related transactions (so-called "swaps" for instance) provided a ready means of evading a tax levied on currency only. Accordingly, most debate on the issue has shifted towards a general financial transaction tax which would capture such proxies. Other measures to avoid punishing hedging (a form of insurance for cashflows) were also proposed. By the 2010s the Basel II and Basel III frameworks required reporting that would help to differentiate them and economic thought was tending to reject the belief that they could not be differentiated, or (as the "Chicago School" had held) should not be.

== Recent proposals ==
In March 2016 China drafted rules to impose a genuine currency transaction tax and this was referred to in financial press as a Tobin tax. This was widely viewed as a warning to curb shorting of its currency the yuan. It was however expected to keep this tax at 0% initially, calculating potential revenue from different rate schemes and exemptions, and not to impose the actual tax unless speculation increased.

Also in 2016 US Democratic Party POTUS nominee Hillary Clinton included in her platform a vow to "Impose a tax on high-frequency trading. The growth of high-frequency trading has unnecessarily placed stress on our markets, created instability, and enabled unfair and abusive trading strategies. Hillary would impose a tax on harmful high-frequency trading and reform rules to make our stock markets fairer, more open, and transparent.". However, the term "high-frequency" implied that only a few large volume transaction players engaged in arbitrage would likely be affected. Clinton referred separately to "Impose a risk fee on the largest financial institutions. Big banks and financial companies would be required to pay a fee based on their size and their risk of contributing to another crisis." The calculations of such fees would necessarily depend on financial risk management criteria (see Basel II and Basel III). Because of its restriction to so-called "harmful high-frequency trading" rather than to inter-currency transactions, neither of Clinton's proposals could be considered a true Tobin tax though international exposure would be a factor in the "risk fee".

== Concepts and definitions ==
=== Hedging vs. speculation ===
Critics of all financial transaction taxes and currency transaction taxes emphasize the financial risk management difficulty of differentiating hedging from speculation, and the economic argument (attributed to the "Chicago School") that they cannot in principle be differentiated. However, advocates of such taxes considered these problems manageable, especially in context of broader financial transaction tax.

=== Tobin's concept ===
James Tobin's purpose in developing his idea of a currency transaction tax was to find a way to manage exchange-rate volatility. In his view, "currency exchanges transmit disturbances originating in international financial markets. National economies and national governments are not capable of adjusting to massive movements of funds across the foreign exchanges, without real hardship and without significant sacrifice of the objectives of national economic policy with respect to employment, output, and inflation."

Tobin saw two solutions to this issue. The first was to move "toward a common currency, common monetary and fiscal policy, and economic integration." The second was to move "toward greater financial segmentation between nations or currency areas, permitting their central banks and governments greater autonomy in policies tailored to their specific economic institutions and objectives." Tobin's preferred solution was the former one but he did not see this as politically viable so he advocated for the latter approach: "I therefore regretfully recommend the second, and my proposal is to throw some sand in the wheels of our excessively efficient international money markets."

Tobin's method of "throwing sand in the wheels" was to suggest a tax on all spot conversions of one currency into another, proportional to the size of the transaction. In the development of his idea, Tobin was influenced by the earlier work of John Maynard Keynes on general financial transaction taxes.

Keynes' concept stems from 1936 when he proposed that a transaction tax should be levied on dealings on Wall Street, where he argued that excessive speculation by uninformed financial traders increased volatility. For Keynes (who was himself a speculator) the key issue was the proportion of 'speculators' in the market, and his concern that, if left unchecked, these types of players would become too dominant.

=== Variations on idea ===
The most common variations on Tobin's idea are a general currency transaction tax, a more general financial transaction tax and (the most general) Robin Hood tax on transactions only richer investors can afford to engage in.

==== Pollin and Baker ====
A key issue with Tobin's tax was "avoidance by change of product mix... market participants would have an incentive to substitute out of financial instruments subject to the tax and into instruments not subject to it. In this fashion, markets would innovate so as to avoid the tax... [so] focusing on just spot currency markets would clearly induce a huge shifting of transactions into futures and derivatives markets. Thus, the real issue is how to design a tax that takes account of all the methods and margins of substitution that investors have for changing their patterns of activity to avoid the tax. Taking account of these considerations implies a Tobin tax that is bigger in scope, and pushes the design toward a generalized securities transaction tax that resembles the tax suggested by Pollin et al. (1999). There are four benefits to this. First, it is likely to generate significantly greater revenues. Second, it maintains a level playing field across financial markets so that no individual financial instrument is arbitrarily put at a competitive disadvantage versus another. Third, it is likely to enhance domestic financial market stability by discouraging domestic asset speculation. Fourth, to the extent that advanced economies already put too many real resources into financial dealings, it would cut back on this resource use, freeing these resources for other productive uses [Fourth] such substitution is costly both in resource use, and because alternative instruments do not provide exactly the same services [thus] just as the market provides an incentive to avoid a Tobin tax, so too it automatically sets in motion forces that deter excessive avoidance." - Palley, 2000

Pollin, Palley and Baker (2000) emphasize that transaction taxes "have clearly not prevented the efficient functioning of these markets. "

==== The Spahn tax ====
According to Paul Bernd Spahn in 1995, "Analysis has shown that the Tobin tax as originally proposed is not viable and should be laid aside for good."

==== Special drawing rights ====
On September 19, 2001, retired speculator George Soros put forward a proposal based on the IMF's existing special drawing rights (SDRs) mechanism. In Soros' scheme, rich countries would pledge SDRs (which are denominated as a basket of multiple 'hard' currencies) for the purpose of providing international assistance. Soros was not necessarily dismissing the Tobin tax idea. He stated, "I think there is a case for a Tobin tax ... (but) it is not at all clear to me that a Tobin tax would reduce volatility in the currency markets. It is true that it may discourage currency speculation but it would also reduce the liquidity of the marketplace." In this Soros appeared to agree with the Chicago School.

=== Scope ===
The term "Tobin tax" has sometimes been used interchangeably with a specific currency transaction tax (CTT) in the manner of Tobin's original idea, and other times it has been used interchangeably with the various different ideas of a more general financial transaction tax (FTT). In both cases, the various ideas proposed have included both national and multinational concepts. Examples of associating Tobin's tax with these:

- April 2001:
  The concept of a Tobin tax has experienced a resurgence in the discussion on reforming the international financial system. In addition to many legislative initiatives in favour of the Tobin tax in national parliaments, possible ways to introduce a Tobin-style currency transaction tax (CTT) are being scrutinised by the United Nations.
- December 2009:
  European Union leaders urged the International Monetary Fund on Friday to consider a global tax on financial transactions in spite of opposition from the US and doubts at the IMF itself. In a communiqué issued after a two-day summit, the EU's 27 national leaders stopped short of making a formal appeal for the introduction of a so-called "Tobin tax" but made clear they regarded it as a potentially useful revenue-raising instrument.

== Proposals and implementations ==
It was originally assumed that the Tobin tax would require multilateral implementation, since one country acting alone would find it very difficult to implement this tax. Many people have therefore argued that it would be best implemented by an international institution. It has been proposed that having the United Nations manage a Tobin tax would solve this problem and would give the UN a large source of funding independent from donations by participating states. However, there have also been initiatives of national dimension about the tax. (This is in addition to the many countries that have foreign exchange controls.)

While finding some support in countries with strong left-wing political movements such as France and Latin America, the Tobin tax proposal came under much criticism from economists and governments, especially those with liberal markets and a large international banking sector, who said it would be impossible to implement and would destabilise foreign exchange markets.

Most of the actual implementation of Tobin taxes, whether in the form of a specific currency transaction tax, or a more general financial transaction tax, has occurred at a national level. In July, 2006, analyst Marion G. Wrobel examined the international experiences of various countries with financial transaction taxes.

=== EU financial transaction tax ===
EU Financial transaction tax Supporting EU countries Opposing EU countries Undecided Euro countries Undecided non-Euro countries

The EU financial transaction tax (EU FTT) is a proposal made by the European Commission in September 2011 to introduce a financial transaction tax within the 27 member states of the European Union by 2014. The tax would only impact financial transactions between financial institutions charging 0.1% against the exchange of shares and bonds and 0.01% across derivative contracts. According to the European Commission it could raise €57 billion every year, of which around €10bn (£8.4bn) would go to Great Britain, which hosts Europe's biggest financial center. It is unclear whether a financial transaction tax is compatible with European law.

If implemented the tax must be paid in the European country where the financial operator is established. This "R plus I" (residence plus issuance) solution means the EU-FTT would cover all transactions that involve a single European firm, no matter if these transactions are carried out in the EU or elsewhere in the world. The scheme makes it impossible for say French or German banks to avoid the tax by moving their transactions offshore, unless they give up all their European customers.

Being faced with stiff resistance from some non-eurozone EU countries, particularly United Kingdom and Sweden, a group of eleven states began pursuing the idea of utilizing enhanced co-operation to implement the tax in states which wish to participate. Opinion polls indicate that 41 percent of the British people are in favour of some forms of FTT (see section: Public opinion).

The proposal supported by the eleven EU member states, was approved in the European Parliament in December 2012, and by the Council of the European Union in January 2013. The formal agreement on the details of the EU FTT still need to be decided upon and approved by the European Parliament.

=== Swedish financial transaction taxes ===
Wrobel's paper highlighted the Swedish experience with financial transaction taxes. In January 1984, Sweden introduced a 0.5% tax on the purchase or sale of an equity security. Thus a round trip (purchase and sale) transaction resulted in a 1% tax. In July 1986 the rate was doubled. In January 1989, a considerably lower tax of 0.002% on fixed-income securities was introduced for a security with a maturity of 90 days or less. On a bond with a maturity of five years or more, the tax was 0.003%.

The revenues from taxes were disappointing; for example, revenues from the tax on fixed-income securities were initially expected to amount to 1,500 million Swedish kronor per year. They did not amount to more than 80 million Swedish kronor in any year and the average was closer to 50 million. In addition, as taxable trading volumes fell, so did revenues from capital gains taxes, entirely offsetting revenues from the equity transactions tax that had grown to 4,000 million Swedish kronor by 1988.

On the day that the tax was announced, share prices fell by 2.2%. But there was leakage of information prior to the announcement, which might explain the 5.35% price decline in the 30 days prior to the announcement. When the tax was doubled, prices again fell by another 1%. These declines were in line with the capitalized value of future tax payments resulting from expected trades. It was further felt that the taxes on fixed-income securities only served to increase the cost of government borrowing, providing another argument against the tax.

Even though the tax on fixed-income securities was much lower than that on equities, the impact on market trading was much more dramatic. During the first week of the tax, the volume of bond trading fell by 85%, even though the tax rate on five-year bonds was only 0.003%. The volume of futures trading fell by 98% and the options trading market disappeared. On 15 April 1990, the tax on fixed-income securities was abolished. In January 1991 the rates on the remaining taxes were cut in half and by the end of the year they were abolished completely. Once the taxes were eliminated, trading volumes returned and grew substantially in the 1990s and 2000s.

==== Tobin tax proponents reaction to the Swedish experience ====
The Swedish experience of a transaction tax was with purchase or sale of equity securities, fixed income securities and derivatives. In global international currency trading, however, the situation could, some argue, look quite different.

Wrobel's studies do not address the global economy as a whole, as James Tobin did when he spoke of "the nineties' crises in Mexico, South East Asia and Russia," which included the 1994 economic crisis in Mexico, the 1997 Asian financial crisis, and the 1998 Russian financial crisis.

=== British stock transaction tax (Stamp Duty) ===
An existing example of a Financial Transaction Tax (FTT) is Stamp Duty Reserve Tax (SDRT) and stamp duty. Stamp duty was introduced as an ad valorem tax on share purchases in 1808, preceding by over 150 years the Tobin tax on currency transactions. Changes were made in 1963. In 1963 the rate of the UK Stamp Duty was 2%, subsequently fluctuating between 1% and 2%, until a process of its gradual reduction started in 1984, when the rate was halved, first from 2% to 1%, and then once again in 1986 from 1% to the current level of 0.5%.

The changes in Stamp Duty rates in 1974, 1984, and 1986 provided researchers with "natural experiments", allowing them to measure the impact of transaction taxes on market volume, volatility, returns, and valuations of UK companies listed on the London Stock Exchange. Jackson and O'Donnel (1985), using UK quarterly data, found that the 1% cut in the Stamp Duty in April 1984 from 2% to 1% lead to a "dramatic 70% increase in equity turnover". Analyzing all three Stamp Duty rate changes, Saporta and Kan (1997) found that the announcements of tax rate increases (decreases) were followed by negative (positive) returns, but even though these results were statistically significant, they were likely to be influenced by other factors, because the announcements were made on Budget Days. Bond et al. (2005) confirmed the findings of previous studies, noting also that the impact of the announced tax rate cuts was more beneficial (increasing market value more significantly) in case of larger firms, which had higher turnover, and were therefore more affected by the transaction tax than stocks of smaller companies, less frequently traded.

Because the UK tax code provides exemptions from the Stamp Duty Reserve Tax for all financial intermediaries, including market makers, investment banks and other members of the LSE, and due to the strong growth of the contract for difference (CFD) industry, which provides UK investors with untaxed substitutes for LSE stocks, according to the Oxera (2007) report, more than 70% percent of the total UK stock market volume, including the entire institutional volume remained (in 2005) exempt from the Stamp Duty, in contrast to the common perception of this tax as a "tax on bank transactions" or a "tax on speculation". On the other hand, as much as 40% of the Stamp Duty revenues come from taxing foreign residents, because the tax is "chargeable whether the transaction takes place in the UK or overseas, and whether either party is resident in the UK or not."

=== Sterling Stamp Duty ===
In 2005, the Tobin tax was developed into a modern proposal by the United Kingdom NGO Stamp Out Poverty. It simplified the two-tier tax in favour of a mechanism designed solely as a means for raising development revenue. The currency market by this time had grown to $2,000 billion a day. To investigate the feasibility of such a tax they hired the City of London firm Intelligence Capital, who found that a tax on the pound sterling wherever it was traded in the world, as opposed to a tax on all currencies traded in the UK, was indeed feasible and could be unilaterally implemented by the UK government.

The Sterling Stamp Duty, as it became known, was to be set at a rate 200 times lower than Tobin had envisaged in 2001, which "pro Tobin tax" supporters claim wouldn't have affected currency markets and could still raise large sums of money. The global currency market grew to $3,200 billion a day in 2007, or £400,000 billion per annum with the trade in sterling, the fourth most traded currency in the world, worth £34,000 billion a year. A sterling stamp duty set at 0.005% as some claim would have raised in the region of £2 billion a year in 2007. The All Party Parliamentary Group for Debt, Aid and Trade published a report in November 2007 into financing for development in which it recommended that the UK government undertake rigorous research into the implementation of a 0.005% stamp duty on all sterling foreign exchange transactions, to provide additional revenue to help bridge the funding gap required to pay for the Millennium Development Goals.

=== Multinational proposals ===
In 1996, the United Nations Development Programme sponsored a comprehensive feasibility and cost-benefit study of the Tobin tax: Haq, Mahbub ul; Kaul, Inge; Grunberg, Isabelle (August 1996). The Tobin Tax: Coping with Financial Volatility. Oxford University Press. ISBN 978-0-19-511180-4.

==== European idea for a 'first Euro tax' ====
In late 2001, a Tobin tax amendment was adopted by the French National Assembly. However, it was overturned by March 2002 by the French Senate.

On June 15, 2004, the Commission of Finance and Budget in the Belgian Federal Parliament approved a bill implementing a Spahn tax. According to the legislation, Belgium will introduce the Tobin tax once all countries of the eurozone introduce a similar law. In July 2005 former Austrian chancellor Wolfgang Schüssel called for a European Union Tobin tax to base the communities' financial structure on more stable and independent grounds. However, the proposal was rejected by the European Commission.

On November 23, 2009, the President of the European Council, Herman Van Rompuy, after attending a meeting of the Bilderberg Group argued for a European version of the Tobin tax. This tax would go beyond just financial transactions: "all shopping and petrol would be taxed.". Countering him was his sister, Christine Van Rompuy, who said, "any new taxes would directly affect the poor".

On June 29, 2011, the European Commission called for Tobin-style taxes on the EU's financial sector to generate direct revenue starting from 2014. At the same time it suggested to reduce existing levies coming from the 27 member states.

==== G20 nations ====
The first nation in the G20 group to formally accept the Tobin tax was Canada. On March 23, 1999, the House of Commons of Canada passed a resolution directing the government to "enact a tax on financial transactions in concert with the international community." However, ten years later, in November 2009, at the G20 finance ministers summit in Scotland, the representatives of the minority government of Canada spoke publicly on the world stage in opposition to that House of Commons of Canada resolution.

In September 2009, French president Nicolas Sarkozy brought up the issue of a Tobin tax once again, suggesting it be adopted by the G20.

On November 7, 2009, prime minister Gordon Brown said that G-20 should consider a tax on speculation, although did not specify that it should be on currency trading alone. The BBC reported that there was a negative response to the plan among the G20.

By December 11, 2009, European Union leaders expressed broad support for a Tobin tax in a communiqué sent to the International Monetary Fund.

For supporters of a Tobin tax, there is a wide range of opinion on who should administer a global Tobin tax and what the revenue should be used for. There are some who think that it should take the form of an insurance: In early November 2009, at the G20 finance ministers summit in Scotland, the British Prime Minister "Mr. Brown and Nicolas Sarkozy, France's president, suggested that revenues from the Tobin tax could be devoted to the world's fight against climate change, especially in developing countries. They suggested that funding could come from "a global financial transactions tax." However British officials later argued the main point of a financial transactions tax would be provide insurance for the global taxpayer against a future banking crisis."

==== The feasibility of gradual implementation of the FTT, beginning with a few EU nations ====
This scenario is possible, given the events in May and June, 2010:

- On June 27, 2010, at the 2010 G-20 Toronto summit, the G20 leaders declared that a "global tax" was no longer "on the table," but that individual countries will be able to decide whether to implement a levy against financial institutions to recoup billions of dollars in taxpayer-funded bailouts.
- Nevertheless, Britain, France and Germany had already agreed before the summit to impose a "bank tax." On May 20, 2010, German officials were understood to favour a financial transaction tax over a financial activities tax.

===== Simultaneous taxes in the European Union =====
On June 28, 2010, the European Union's executive said it will study whether the European Union should go alone in imposing a tax on financial transactions after G20 leaders failed to agree on the issue.

The financial transaction tax would be separate from a bank levy, or a resolution levy, which some governments are also proposing to impose on banks to insure them against the costs of any future bailouts. EU leaders instructed their finance ministers, in May, 2010, to work out by the end of October 2010, details for the banking levy, but any financial transaction tax remains much more controversial.

==== Latin America – Bank of the South ====
In early November 2007, a regional Tobin tax was adopted by the Bank of the South, after an initiative of Presidents Hugo Chávez from Venezuela and Néstor Kirchner from Argentina.

==== UN Global Tax ====
According to Stephen Spratt, "the revenues raised could be used for ... international development objectives ... such as meeting the Millennium Development Goals."(, p. 19) These are eight international development goals that 192 United Nations member states and at least 23 international organizations have agreed (in 2000) to achieve by the year 2015. They include reducing extreme poverty, reducing child mortality rates, fighting disease epidemics such as AIDS, and developing a global partnership for development.

At the UN September 2001 World Conference against Racism, when the issue of compensation for colonialism and slavery arose in the agenda, Fidel Castro, the President of Cuba, advocated the Tobin Tax to address that issue. (According to Cliff Kincaid, Castro advocated it "specifically in order to generate U.S. financial reparations to the rest of the world," however a closer reading of Castro's speech shows that he never did mention "the rest of the world" as being recipients of revenue.) Castro cited Holocaust reparations as a previously established precedent for the concept of reparations.

== Original idea and anti-globalization movement ==
Tobin's more specific concept of a "currency transaction tax" from 1972 lay dormant for more than 20 years but was revived by the advent of the 1997 Asian financial crisis. In December, 1997 Ignacio Ramonet, editor of Le Monde Diplomatique, renewed the debate around the Tobin tax with an editorial titled "Disarming the markets". Ramonet proposed to create an association for the introduction of this tax, which was named ATTAC (Association for the Taxation of financial Transactions for the Aid of Citizens). The tax then became an issue of the global justice movement or alter-globalization movement and a matter of discussion not only in academic institutions but even in streets and in parliaments in the UK, France, and around the world.

In an interview given to the Italian independent radio network Radio Popolare in July 2001 James Tobin distanced himself from the global justice movement. "There are agencies and groups in Europe that have used the Tobin Tax as an issue of broader campaigns, for reasons that go far beyond my proposal. My proposal was made into a sort of milestone for an antiglobalization program". James Tobin's interview with Radio Popolare was quoted by the Italian foreign minister at the time, former director-general of the World Trade Organization Renato Ruggiero, during a Parliamentary debate on the eve of the G8 2001 summit in Genoa. Afterwards James Tobin distanced himself from the global justice movement.

Tobin observed that, while his original proposal had only the goal of "putting a brake on the foreign exchange trafficking", the antiglobalization movement had stressed "the income from the taxes with which they want to finance their projects to improve the world". He declared himself not contrary to this use of the tax's income, but stressed that it was not the important aspect of the tax.

ATTAC and other organizations have recognized that while they still consider Tobin's original aim as paramount, they think the tax could produce funds for development needs in the South (such as the Millennium Development Goals), and allow governments, and therefore citizens, to reclaim part of the democratic space conceded to the financial markets.

In March, 2002, London School of Economics Professor Willem Buiter, who studied under James Tobin, wrote an obituary for the man, but also remarked that, "This [Tobin Tax] ... was in recent years adopted by some of the most determined enemies of trade liberalisation, globalisation and the open society." Buiter added, "The proposal to use the Tobin tax as a means of raising revenues for development assistance was rejected by Tobin, and he forcefully repudiated the anti-globalisation mantra of the Seattle crowd." In September 2009, Buiter also wrote in the Financial Times, "Tobin was a genius ... but the Tobin tax was probably his one daft idea".

In those same "years" that Buiter spoke of, the Tobin tax was also "adopted" or supported in varying degrees by the people who were not, as he put it, "enemies of trade liberalisation." Among them were several supporters from 1990 to 1999, including Larry Summers and several from 2000 to 2004, including lukewarm support from George Soros.

== Evaluating the Tobin tax as a Currency Transaction Tax (CTT) ==
=== Stability, volatility and speculation ===
==== The appeal of stability ====
In 1972, Tobin examined the global monetary system that remained after the Bretton Woods monetary system was abandoned. This examination was subsequently revisited by other analysts, such as Ellen Frank, who, in 2002 wrote: "If by globalization we mean the determined efforts of international businesses to build markets and production networks that are truly global in scope, then the current monetary system is in many ways an endless headache whose costs are rapidly outstripping its benefits." She continues with a view on how that monetary system stability is appealing to many players in the world economy, but is being undermined by volatility and fluctuation in exchange rates: "Money scrambles around the globe in quest of the banker's holy grail – sound money of stable value – while undermining every attempt by cash-strapped governments to provide the very stability the wealthy crave."

Frank then corroborates Tobin's comments on the problems this instability can create (e.g. high interest rates) for developing countries such as Mexico (1994), countries in South East Asia (1997), and Russia (1998). She writes, "Governments of developing countries try to peg their currencies, only to have the peg undone by capital flight. They offer to dollarize or euroize, only to find themselves so short of dollars that they are forced to cut off growth. They raise interest rates to extraordinary levels to protect investors against currency losses, only to topple their economies and the source of investor profits. ... IMF bailouts provide a brief respite for international investors but they are, even from the perspective of the wealthy, a short-term solution at best ... they leave countries with more debt and fewer options."

==== Effect on volatility ====
One of the main economic hypotheses raised in favor of financial transaction taxes is that such taxes reduce return volatility, leading to an increase of long-term investor utility or more predictable levels of exchange rates. The impact of such a tax on volatility is of particular concern because the main justification given for this tax by Tobin was to improve the autonomy of macroeconomic policy by curbing international currency speculation and its destabilizing effect on national exchange rates.

===== Theoretical models =====
Most studies of the likely impact of the Tobin tax on financial markets volatility have been theoretical—researches conducted laboratory simulations or constructed economic models. Some of these theoretical studies have concluded that a transaction tax could reduce volatility by crowding out speculators or eliminating individual 'noise traders' but that it 'would not have any impact on volatility in case of sufficiently deep global markets such as those in major currency pairs, unlike in case of less liquid markets, such as those in stocks and (especially) options, where volatility would probably increase with reduced volumes. Behavioral finance theoretical models, such as those developed by Wei and Kim (1997) or Westerhoff and Dieci (2006) suggest that transaction taxes can reduce volatility, at least in the foreign exchange market. In contrast, some papers find a positive effect of a transaction tax on market volatility. Lanne and Vesala (2006) argue that a transaction tax "is likely to amplify, not dampen, volatility in foreign exchange markets", because such tax penalises informed market participants disproportionately more than uninformed ones, leading to volatility increases.

===== Empirical studies =====
In most of the available empirical studies however, no statistically significant causal link has been found between an increase in transaction costs (transaction taxes or government-controlled minimum brokerage commissions) and a reduction in volatility—in fact a frequent unintended consequence observed by 'early adopters' after the imposition of a financial transactions tax (see Werner, 2003) has been an increase in the volatility of stock market returns, usually coinciding with significant declines in liquidity (market volume) and thus in taxable revenue (Umlauf, 1993).

For a recent evidence to the contrary, see, e.g., Liu and Zhu (2009), which may be affected by selection bias given that their Japanese sample is subsumed by a research conducted in 14 Asian countries by Hu (1998), showing that "an increase in tax rate reduces the stock price but has no significant effect on market volatility". As Liu and Zhu (2009) point out, [...] the different experience in Japan highlights the comment made by Umlauf (1993) that it is hazardous to generalize limited evidence when debating important policy issues such as the STT [securities transaction tax] and brokerage commissions."

=== Optimum Tobin tax rate ===
When James Tobin was interviewed by Der Spiegel in 2001, the tax rate he suggested was 0.5%. His use of the phrase "let's say" ("sagen wir") indicated that he was not, at that point, in an interview setting, trying to be precise. Others have tried to be more precise or practical in their search for the Tobin tax rate.

According to Garber (1996), competitive pressure on transaction costs (spreads) in currency markets has reduced these costs to fractions of a basis point. For example, the EUR.USD currency pair trades with spreads as tight as 1/10 of a basis point, i.e. with just a 0.00001 difference between the bid and offer price, so "a tax on transactions in foreign exchange markets imposed unilaterally, 6/1000 of a basis point (or 0.00006%) is a realistic maximum magnitude." Similarly Shvedov (2004) concludes that "even making the unrealistic assumption that the rate of 0.00006% causes no reduction of trading volume, the tax on foreign currency exchange transactions would yield just $4.3 billion a year, despite an annual turnover in dozens of trillion dollars."

Accordingly, one of the modern Tobin tax versions, called the Sterling Stamp Duty, sponsored by certain UK charities, has a rate of 0.005% "in order to avoid market distortions", i.e., 1/100 of what Tobin himself envisaged in 2001. Sterling Stamp Duty supporters argue that this tax rate would not adversely affect currency markets and could still raise large sums of money.

The same rate of 0.005% was proposed for a currency transactions tax (CTT) in a report prepared by Rodney Schmidt for The North-South Institute (a Canadian NGO whose "research supports global efforts to [..] improve international financial systems and institutions"). Schmidt (2007) used the observed negative relationship between bid–ask spreads and transactions volume in foreign exchange markets to estimate the maximum "non-disruptive rate" of a currency transaction tax. A CTT tax rate designed with a pragmatic goal of raising revenue for various development projects, rather than to fulfill Tobin's original goals (of "slowing the flow of capital across borders" and "preventing or managing exchange rate crises"), should avoid altering the existing "fundamental market behavior", and thus, according to Schmidt, must not exceed 0.00005, i.e., the observed levels of currency transaction costs (bid-ask spreads).

The mathematician Paul Wilmott has pointed out that while perhaps some trading ought to be discouraged, trading for the hedging of derivatives is generally considered a good thing in that it can reduce risk, and this should not be punished. He estimates that any financial tax should be at most one basis point so as to have negligible effect on hedging.

Assuming that all currency market participants incur the same maximum level of transaction costs (the full cost of the bid-ask spread), as opposed to earning them in their capacity of market makers, and assuming that no untaxed substitutes exist for spot currency markets transactions (such as currency futures and currency exchange-traded funds), Schmidt (2007) finds that a CTT rate of 0.00005 would be nearly volume-neutral, reducing foreign exchange transaction volumes by only 14%. Such volume-neutral CTT tax would raise relatively little revenue though, estimated at $33 bn annually, i.e., an order of magnitude less than the "carbon tax [which] has by far the greatest revenue-raising potential, estimated at $130-750 bn annually." The author warns however that both these market-based revenue estimates "are necessarily speculative", and he has more confidence in the revenue-raising potential of "The International Finance Facility (IFF) and International Finance Facility for Immunisation (IFFIm)."

=== Is the tax easy to avoid ===
==== Technical feasibility ====
Although Tobin had said his own tax idea was unfeasible in practice, Joseph Stiglitz, former Senior Vice President and Chief Economist of the World Bank, said, on October 5, 2009, that modern technology meant that was no longer the case. Stiglitz said, the tax is "much more feasible today" than a few decades ago, when Tobin recanted.

However, on November 7, 2009, at the G20 finance ministers summit in Scotland, Dominique Strauss-Khan, head of the International Monetary Fund, said "transactions are very difficult to measure and so it's very easy to avoid a transaction tax."

Nevertheless, in early December 2009, economist Stephany Griffith-Jones agreed that the "greater centralisation and automisation of the exchanges and banks clearing and settlements systems ... makes avoidance of payment more difficult and less desirable."

In January 2010, feasibility of the tax was supported and clarified by researcher Rodney Schmidt, who noted "it is technically easy to collect a financial tax from exchanges ... transactions taxes can be collected by the central counterparty at the point of the trade, or automatically in the clearing or settlement process." (All large-value financial transactions go through three steps. First dealers agree to a trade; then the dealers' banks match the two sides of the trade through an electronic central clearing system; and finally, the two individual financial instruments are transferred simultaneously to a central settlement system. Thus a tax can be collected at the few places where all trades are ultimately cleared or settled.)

Based on digital technology, a new form of taxation, levied on bank transactions, was successfully used in Brazil from 1993 to 2007 and proved to be evasion-proof, more efficient and less costly than orthodox tax models. In his book, Bank transactions: pathway to the single tax ideal, Marcos Cintra carries out a qualitative and quantitative in-depth comparison of the efficiency, equity and compliance costs of a bank transactions tax relative to orthodox tax systems, and opens new perspectives for the use of modern banking technology in tax reform across the world.

==== How many nations are needed to make it feasible? ====
In the year 2000, "eighty per cent of foreign-exchange trading [took] place in just seven cities. Agreement [to implement the tax] by [just three cities,] London, New York and Tokyo alone, would capture 58 per cent of speculative trading."

== Evaluating the Tobin tax as a general Financial Transaction Tax (FTT) ==
=== Sweden's experience in implementing Tobin taxes ===
In July, 2006, analyst Marion G. Wrobel examined the actual international experiences of various countries in implementing financial transaction taxes. Wrobel's paper highlighted the Swedish experience with financial transaction taxes. In January 1984, Sweden introduced a 0.5% tax on the purchase or sale of an equity security. Thus a round trip (purchase and sale) transaction resulted in a 1% tax. In July 1986 the rate was doubled. In January 1989, a considerably lower tax of 0.002% on fixed income securities was introduced for a security with a maturity of 90 days or less. On a bond with a maturity of five years or more, the tax was 0.003%.

The revenues from taxes were disappointing; for example, revenues from the tax on fixed-income securities were initially expected to amount to 1,500 million Swedish kronor per year. They did not amount to more than 80 million Swedish kronor in any year and the average was closer to 50 million. In addition, as taxable trading volumes fell, so did revenues from capital gains taxes, entirely offsetting revenues from the equity transactions tax that had grown to 4,000 million Swedish kronor by 1988.

On the day that the tax was announced, share prices fell by 2.2%. But there was leakage of information prior to the announcement, which might explain the 5.35% price decline in the 30 days prior to the announcement. When the tax was doubled, prices again fell by another 1%. These declines were in line with the capitalized value of future tax payments resulting from expected trades. It was further felt that the taxes on fixed-income securities only served to increase the cost of government borrowing, providing another argument against the tax.

Even though the tax on fixed-income securities was much lower than that on equities, the impact on market trading was much more dramatic. During the first week of the tax, the volume of bond trading fell by 85%, even though the tax rate on five-year bonds was only 0.003%. The volume of futures trading fell by 98% and the options trading market disappeared. On 15 April 1990, the tax on fixed-income securities was abolished. In January 1991 the rates on the remaining taxes were cut in half and by the end of the year they were abolished completely. Once the taxes were eliminated, trading volumes returned and grew substantially in the 1990s.

==== Tobin tax proponents reaction to the Swedish experience ====
The Swedish experience of a transaction tax was with purchase or sale of equity securities, fixed income securities and derivatives. In global international currency trading, however, the situation could, some argue, look quite different.

Wrobel's studies do not address the global economy as a whole, as James Tobin did when he spoke of "the nineties' crises in Mexico, South East Asia and Russia," which included the 1994 economic crisis in Mexico, the 1997 Asian financial crisis, and the 1998 Russian financial crisis.

=== Pros and cons if the Tobin tax (FTT) were implemented? ===
==== Views of ABAC ====
The APEC Business Advisory Council, the business representatives' body in APEC, which is the forum for facilitating economic growth, cooperation, trade and investment in the Asia-Pacific region, expressed its views in a letter to the IMF on 15 February 2010.

In addition, ABAC expressed further concerns in the letter:

- Key to the APEC agenda is reduction of transaction costs. The proposal is directly counterproductive to this goal.
- It would have a very significant negative impact on real economic recovery, as these additional costs are likely to further reduce financing of business activities at a time when markets remain fragile and prospects for the global economy are still uncertain.
- Industries and consumers as a whole would be unfairly penalized.
- It would further weaken financial markets and reduce the liquidity, particularly in the case of illiquid assets.
- Effective implementation would be virtually impossible, especially as opportunities for cross-border arbitrage arise from decisions of certain jurisdictions not to adopt the tax or to exempt particular activities.
- There is no global consensus why a tax is needed and what the revenue would be used for, and therefore no understanding how much is needed. Any consequential tax would need to be supported by clear consensus for its application.

Note - APEC's 21 Member Economies are Australia, Brunei Darussalam, Canada, Chile, People's Republic of China, Hong Kong, China, Indonesia, Japan, Republic of Korea, Malaysia, Mexico, New Zealand, Papua New Guinea, Peru, The Republic of the Philippines, The Russian Federation, Singapore, Chinese Taipei, Thailand, United States of America, Vietnam.

==== Views of the ITUC/APLN ====
The International Trade Union Confederation/Asia-Pacific Labour Network (ITUC/APLN), the informal trade union body of the Asia-Pacific, supported the Tobin Tax in their Statement to the 2010 APEC Economic Leaders Meeting. The representatives of APEC's national trade unions centers also met with the Japanese Prime Minister, Naoto Kan, the host Leader of APEC for 2010, and called for the Prime Minister's support on the Tobin Tax.

The ITUC shares its support for Tobin Tax with the Trade Union Advisory Council (TUAC), the official OECD trade union body, in a research on the feasibility, strengths and weaknesses of a potential Tobin Tax. ITUC, APLN and TUAC refer to Tobin Tax as the Financial Transactions Tax.

==== Regular investors loss ====
An economist speaking out against the common belief that investment banks would bear the burden of a Tobin tax is Simon Johnson, Professor of Economics at the MIT and a former Chief Economist at the IMF, who in a BBC Radio 4 interview discussing banking system reforms presented his views on the Tobin tax.

===== Let Wall Street Pay for the Restoration of Main Street Bill =====
In 2009, U.S. Representative Peter DeFazio of Oregon proposed a financial transaction tax in his "Let Wall Street Pay for the Restoration of Main Street Bill". (This was proposed domestically for the United States only.)

==== Would there be net job losses if a FTT tax was introduced? ====
Schwabish (2005) examined the potential effects of introducing a stock transaction (or "transfer") tax in a single city (New York) on employment not only in the securities industry, but also in the supporting industries. A financial transactions tax would lead to job losses also in non-financial sectors of the economy through the so-called multiplier effect forwarding in a magnified form any taxes imposed on Wall Street employees through their reduced demand to their suppliers and supporting industries. The author estimated the ratios of financial- to non-financial job losses of between 10:1 to 10:4, that is "a 10 percent decrease in securities industry employment would depress employment in the retail, services, and restaurant sectors by more than 1 percent; in the business services sector by about 4 percent; and in total private jobs by about 1 percent."

It is also possible to estimate the impact of a reduction in stock market volume caused by taxing stock transactions on the rise in the overall unemployment rate. For every 10 percent decline in stock market volume, elasticities estimated by Schwabish implied that a stock transaction ("transfer") tax could cost New York City between 30,000 and 42,000 private-sector jobs, and if the stock market volume reductions reached levels observed by Umlauf (1993) in Sweden after a stock FTT was introduced there ("By 1990, more than 50% of all Swedish trading had moved to London") then according to Schwabish (2005), following an introduction of a FTT tax, there would be 150,000-210,000 private-sector jobs losses in the New York alone.

The cost of currency hedges—and thus "certainty what importers and exporters' money is worth"—has nothing to do with volatility whatsoever, as this cost is exclusively determined by the interest rate differential between two currencies. Nevertheless, as Tobin said, "If ... [currency] is suddenly withdrawn, countries have to drastically increase interest rates for their currency to still be attractive."

=== Is there an optimum tax rate ===
Financial transaction tax rates of the magnitude of 0.1%-1% have been proposed by normative economists, without addressing the practicability of implementing a tax at these levels. In positive economics studies however, where due reference was paid to the prevailing market conditions, the resulting tax rates have been significantly lower.

For instance, Edwards (1993) concluded that if the transaction tax revenue from taxing the futures markets were to be maximized (see Laffer curve), with the tax rate not leading to a prohibitively large increase in the marginal cost of market participants, the rate would have to be set so low that "a tax on futures markets will not achieve any important social objective and will not generate much revenue."

=== Political opinion ===
Opinions are divided between those who applaud that the Tobin tax could protect countries from spillovers of financial crises, and those who claim that the tax would also constrain the effectiveness of the global economic system, increase price volatility, widen bid–ask spreads for end users such as investors, savers and hedgers, and destroy liquidity.

==== Tobin tax proponents response to empirical evidence on volatility ====
Lack of direct supporting evidence for stabilizing (volatility-reducing) properties of Tobin-style transaction taxes in econometric research is acknowledged by some of the Tobin tax supporters:

Ten studies report a positive relationship between transaction taxes and short-term price volatility, five studies did not find any significant relationship. (Schulmeister et al, 2008, p. 18).

These Tobin tax proponents propose on indirect evidence in their favor, reinterpreting studies which do not deal directly with volatility, but instead with trading volume (with volume being generally reduced by transaction taxes, though it constitutes their tax base, see: negative feedback loop). This allows these Tobin tax proponents to state that "some studies show (implicitly) that higher transaction costs might dampen price volatility. This is so because these studies report that a reduction of trading activities is associated with lower price volatility." So if a study finds that reducing trading volume or trading frequency reduces volatility, these Tobin tax supporters combine it with the observation that Tobin-style taxes are volume-reducing, and thus should also indirectly reduce volatility ("this finding implies a negative relationship between [..] transaction tax [..] and volatility, because higher transaction costs will 'ceteris paribus' always dampen trading activities)." (Schulmeister et al., 2008, p. 18).

Some Tobin tax supporters argue that volatility is better defined as a "long-term overshooting of speculative prices" than by standard statistical definitions (e.g., conditional variance of returns) ) which are typically used in empirical studies of volatility.

The lack of empirical evidence to support or clearly refute the Tobin tax proponents' claim it will reduce "excess" volatility is due in part to a lack of an agreed definition of "excess" volatility that allows to be distinguished and formally measured.

==== Should speculators be encouraged, penalized or dissuaded? ====
The Tobin tax rests on the premise that speculators ought to be, as Tobin puts it, "dissuaded." This premise itself is a matter of debate: See Speculation.

On the other side of the debate were the leaders of Germany who, in May 2008, planned to propose a worldwide ban on oil trading by speculators, blaming the 2008 oil price rises on manipulation by hedge funds. At that time India, with similar concerns, had already suspended futures trading of five commodities.

On December 3, 2009, US Congressman Peter DeFazio stated, "The American taxpayers bailed out Wall Street during a crisis brought on by reckless speculation in the financial markets, ... This [ proposed financial transaction tax ] legislation will force Wall Street to do their part and put people displaced by that crisis back to work."

On January 21, 2010, President Barack Obama endorsed the Volcker Rule which deals with proprietary trading of investment banks and restricts banks from making certain speculative kinds of investments if they are not on behalf of their customers. Former U.S. Federal Reserve Chairman Paul Volcker, President Obama's advisor, has argued that such speculation played a key role in the 2008 financial crisis.

Volcker endorsed only the UK's tax on bank bonuses, calling it "interesting", but was wary about imposing levies on financial market transactions, because he is "instinctively opposed" to any tax on financial transactions.

=== Questions of volatility ===
In February 2010, Tim Harford, writing in the Undercover Economist column of the Financial Times, commented directly on the claims of Keynes and Tobin that 'taxes on financial transactions would reduce financial volatility'.

== Comparing Currency Transaction Taxes (CTT) and Financial Transaction Taxes (FTT) ==
=== Research evidence ===
In 2003, researchers like Aliber et al. proposed that empirical evidence on the observed effects of the already introduced and abolished stock transaction taxes and a hypothetical CTT (Tobin) can probably be treated interchangeably. They did not find any evidence on the differential effects of introducing or removing, stock transactions taxes or a hypothetical currency (Tobin) tax on any subset of markets or all markets.

Researchers have used models belonging to the GARCH family to describe both the volatility behavior of stock market returns and the volatility behavior of foreign exchange rates. This is used as evidence that the similarity between currencies and stocks in the context of a tax designed to curb volatility such as a CTT (or FTT in general) can be inferred from the almost identical (statistically indistinguishable) behavior of the volatilities of equity and exchange rate returns.

=== Practical considerations ===
Hanke et al. state, "The economic consequences of introducing a [currency-only] Tobin Tax are [...] completely unknown, as such a tax has not been introduced on any real foreign exchange market so far". At the same time, even in the case of stock transaction taxes, where some empirical evidence is available, researchers warn that "it is hazardous to generalize limited evidence when debating important policy issues such as the transaction taxes".

According to Stephan Schulmeister, Margit Schratzenstaller, and Oliver Picek (2008), from the practical viewpoint it is no longer possible to introduce a non-currency transactions tax (even if foreign exchange transactions were formally exempt) since the advent of currency derivatives and currency exchange-traded funds. All of these would have to be taxed together under a "non-currency" financial transactions tax (such as under certain proposals in the U.S. in 2009 which, although not intending to tax currencies directly, would still do so due to taxation of currency futures and currency exchange traded funds). Because these three groups of instruments are nearly perfect substitutes, if at least one of these groups were to be exempt, it would likely attract most market volume from the taxed alternatives.

According to Stephan Schulmeister, Margit Schratzenstaller, and Oliver Picek (2008), restricting the financial transactions tax to foreign exchange only (as envisaged originally by Tobin) would not be desirable. Any "general FTT seems...more attractive than a specific transaction tax" (such as a currency-only Tobin tax), because it could reduce tax avoidance (i.e., substitution of similar untaxed instruments), could significantly increase the tax base and could be implemented more easily on organized exchanges than in a dealership market like the global foreign exchange market. (See also the discussion of tax avoidance as it relates to a currency transaction tax.)

On October 5, 2009, Joseph Stiglitz said that any new tax should be levied on all asset classes – not merely foreign exchange, and would be based on the gross value of the assets, thereby helping to discourage the creation of asset bubbles.

== Non-tax regulatory equivalent ==
One non-tax regulatory equivalent of Tobin's (very narrow original) tax is to require "non-interest bearing deposit requirements on all open foreign exchange positions.". If these deposit requirements result in forfeits or losses if a currency suddenly declines due to speculation, they act as inhibitions against deliberate speculative shorts of a currency. However, they would not raise funds for other purposes, so are not a tax.

== See also ==
- Bank tax
- Currency transaction tax
- Financial transaction tax
- Foreign exchange market
- Robin Hood tax
- Spahn tax
- Pigovian tax
