= Sudden stop (economics) =

A sudden stop in capital flows is defined as a sudden slowdown in private capital inflows into emerging market economies, and a corresponding sharp reversal from large current account deficits into smaller deficits or small surpluses. Sudden stops are usually followed by a sharp decrease in output, private spending and credit to the private sector, and real exchange rate depreciation. The term "sudden stop" was inspired by a banker's comment on a paper by Rüdiger Dornbusch and Alejandro Werner about Mexico, that "it is not speed that kills, it is the sudden stop."

Sudden stops are commonly described as periods that contain at least one observation where the year-on-year fall in capital flows lies at least two standard deviations below its sample mean. The start of the sudden stop period is determined by the first time the annual change in capital flows falls one standard deviation below the mean and the end of the sudden stop period is determined once the annual change in capital flows exceeds one standard deviation below its sample mean.

== Economic impact ==
The balance of payments identity establishes that the current account is equal to the capital account plus the accumulation of international reserves. Therefore, a large slowdown in capital inflows is met either by a loss of international reserves and/or a lower current account deficit, both of which have negative economic effects.

A reduction in the current account deficit is achieved through a decrease in domestic aggregate demand for tradable goods. Since tradable and non-tradable goods are complements, this also reduces demand for non-tradable goods. The demand for tradable goods reflects in a reduction in imports; however, the lower demand for non-tradable goods translates into lower output and real depreciation of the currency (lower relative price of non tradable to tradable goods). Firms producing non-tradable goods face an increase in the real cost of financing, as the cost of loans in terms of the price of non-tradable goods rises. These firms get lower revenues, which reduce their ability to repay their loans. As a result, banks face a higher rate of non-performing loans from this sector. In this situation, banks become more cautious and decrease loans, which worsens the economic recession.

A collapse in asset prices also contributes to a sharp slowdown in economic activity. The value of loan collaterals are severely reduced which further impacts the situation of the financial system and reduces credit, reflecting in lower consumption and investment. Furthermore, lower asset prices have negative wealth effects for consumers, which further reduce consumption spending. The features of sudden stops are similar to those of balance of payments crises in terms of devaluations of the domestic currency followed by periods of output loss. However, sudden stops are characterized by sharper recessions and a larger fall in the price of non-tradable to tradable goods.

A similar argument relates large changes in relative prices of tradable and non-tradable goods with the effects of a sudden stop. The mechanism is explained by a credit based approach to currency crises, where countries with less developed financial markets experience a sharper output fall during a sudden stop episode, regardless of whether the country has a fixed or floating exchange rate regime, as the source of the crisis is through the deterioration of private firms' balance sheets. Therefore, a higher proportion of foreign currency debt increases the vulnerability to currency devaluations. Different to first generation crisis models, in their model crises may occur even under low unemployment and sound fiscal policies.

An additional effect of sudden stops and third generation crises in emerging markets are related to financial institutions and sudden stops in short term capital inflows, in comparison to previous crises where the main features were related to fiscal imbalances or weakness in real activity. In this type of model, international financial markets play a key role, where small open economies face a problem of international illiquidity during the crisis episodes, associated with the collapse of the financial system.

Due to the inherent structure of the banking system, banks transform maturity from liquid deposits to illiquid assets, which creates vulnerability to bank runs. Even in situations where banks might be solvent, in the short run bank runs create an illiquidity problem, where banks would need to borrow funds to meet the temporary deposit withdrawals. However, under this situation, it might be harder to obtain foreign funds, as foreign creditors may also panic depending on the degree of commitment to repay international debts. Moreover, the higher the level of short term debt the higher the exposure to illiquidity problems. This models is particularly related to the situation in emerging markets, because of the larger role of banks compared to other financial institutions in these economies and because it is more difficult for them to get emergency funds from world markets during crisis periods.

An alternative explanation of sudden stops focuses on the interaction of temporary and permanent technology shocks, where highly volatile trend shocks in emerging market economies are closely related to sudden stop episodes. Emerging markets are characterized by frequent regime switches related to changes in fiscal, monetary and trade policies, which reflect in more volatile shocks to the trend. The sharp effects of sudden stop episodes are not only related to the large magnitude of the shock, but also to the fact that there is a negative productivity shock with a change in trend.

In order to study sudden stop episodes, using data from the 1994 economic crisis in Mexico, this model decomposes it to obtain a representation of transitory and permanent technology shocks. The results show that including permanent technology shocks is able to produce the behavior observed during a sudden stop episode. The model predicts a large contraction in output, consumption and investment, as well as a sharp current account reversal.

== Empirical issues ==
Empirical studies mention a group of indicators that may be related to sudden stops. The composition of capital inflows, with a higher proportion of short term financing may be more risky as they generate larger slowdowns in capital inflows. The time profile of maturity debt is important in assessing the potential for sudden reversals in capital flows. The shorter the maturity of a country's debt, the more prone it is for a sudden stop crises.

=== Emerging markets ===
Some empirical studies focus on the interaction between sudden stops and financial crises in emerging market economies. Using a sample of emerging market countries with large capital inflows from Latin America, Asia and Europe, they compare the severity of the sudden stop episodes associated with currency crises and banking crises. The severity of sudden stop episodes in emerging market economies are compared using indicators such as the real depreciation of the currency and indicators of currency and banking crises. Results suggest that currency and banking crises in Asia in 1995-1997 were more severe than the sharpest crises in Latin America, in terms of banking bailout costs and the size of capital account reversal. Also, emerging economies are more exposed to suffer this type of crisis as well as current-account reversals.

Another topic of study is the impact of sudden stops on output. Sudden stops can be accompanied by a currency crisis and/or a banking crisis. Empirical studies show that the effects of a banking crisis are more pernicious than the effects of a currency crisis, due to the additional effect of the credit channel on output. Lower asset prices are a persistent fact after a banking crisis, which indicate a low value of collaterals to loans, and therefore, negatively impact the banking sector and the supply of loans.

Regarding exports, currency crises show a faster recovery in the export sector, while exports remain low for an average of two years after banking crises. Banking crises also present a sharper recession, consistent with the disruption of the financial sector. There is a distinguishable boom–bust cycle, as unsustainable massive capital inflows that precede a sudden stop episode sharply increase economic activity.

=== Emerging markets and advanced economies ===
Other studies focus on the relationship between current account reversals and sudden stops in both emerging markets and advanced economies. Using cross-country data for a sample of 157 countries during the 1970-2001 period, the results indicate that 46.1% of countries that suffered a sudden stop also faced a current account reversal, while 22.9% of countries that faced current account reversals also faced a sudden stop episode. The less-than-one relationship could be related to an effective use of international reserves to offset capital outflows during sudden stops, while during current account reversals, there are some countries that were not receiving large capital inflows, so their deficits were financed through a loss of international reserves.

A comparison of the stylized facts observed during sudden stop episodes in emerging market economies and developed countries on the financial crises of the 1990s relate sudden stops in emerging market and advanced economies with the presence of contagion effects. Most sudden stop episodes for emerging markets occur around the Tequila (1994), East Asian (1997) and Russian (1998) crises. In the case of developed economies, sudden stop episodes occur around the European Exchange Rate Mechanism (ERM) (1992–1993) crisis.

== Policy measures ==
Regarding policy measures adopted during sudden stop episodes, the massive slowdown in capital inflows, usually presented as large capital outflows, can be counteracted by exchange rate devaluation, loss of international reserves and/or increases in real interest rates. The nominal exchange rate behavior during most sudden stop episodes show that sudden stops in emerging markets are followed by a devaluation of the domestic currency, while most depreciation episodes in developed countries are not related to sudden stop phases. Real interest rates sharply increase during sudden stop episodes, especially in the case of emerging market economies. A sharp loss of international reserves is also observed during sudden stop episodes, both in developed countries and emerging markets. The current account balance shows a sharp reduction in current account deficits, with a significantly higher increase in the current account balance in emerging markets.

In open economies government credit support programs--credit lines and guarantees--can relax collateral constraints, reduce financial intermediaries' risk aversion and boost domestic credit supply amidst shrinking international capital flows.

== See also ==
- Balance of payments
- Bank run
- Capital flight
- Currency crisis
- Domestic liability dollarization
- Financial crisis
- Sovereign default
