= Mexican peso crisis =

Economic crisis in Mexico

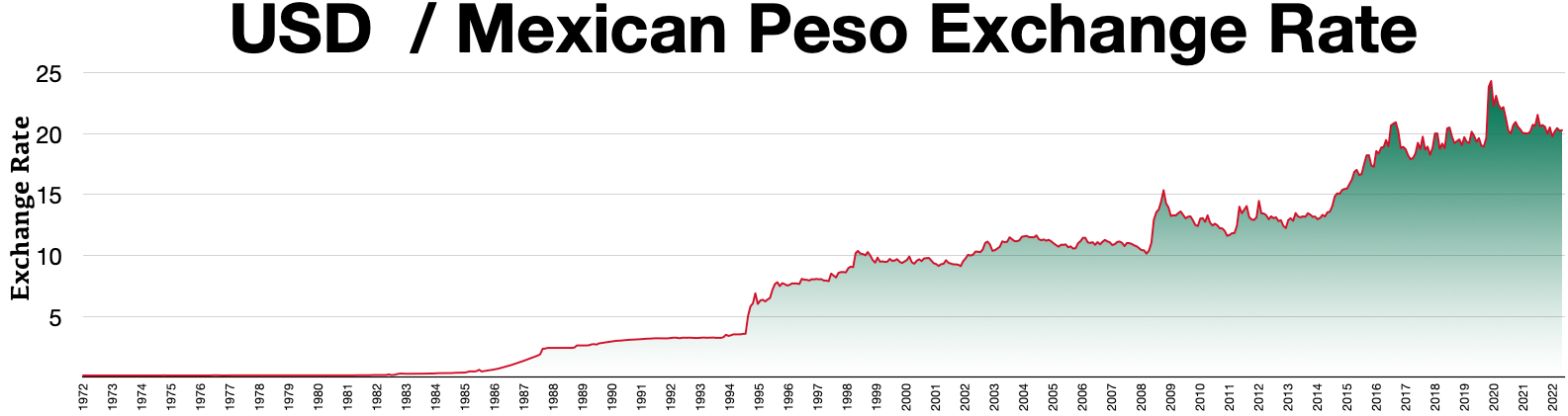
USD/MXN exchange rate

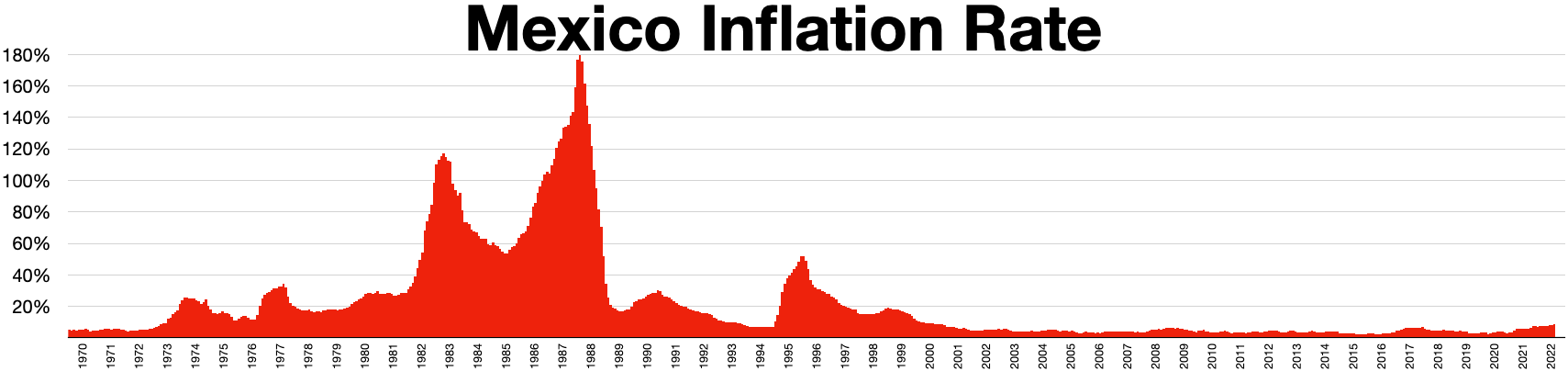
Mexico inflation rate 1970-2022

The Mexican peso crisis was a currency crisis sparked by the Mexican government's sudden devaluation of the peso against the U.S. dollar in December 1994, which became one of the first international financial crises ignited by capital flight.

In the months leading up to the 1994 Mexican presidential election, the administration of incumbent president Carlos Salinas embarked on an expansionary fiscal and monetary policy. The Mexican treasury began issuing short-term debt instruments denominated in domestic currency with a guaranteed repayment in U.S. dollars, attracting foreign investors. Mexico enjoyed investor confidence and new access to international capital following its signing of the North American Free Trade Agreement (NAFTA). However, a violent uprising in the state of Chiapas, as well as the assassination of the presidential candidate Luis Donaldo Colosio, resulted in political instability, causing investors to place an increased risk premium on Mexican assets.

In response, the Bank of Mexico, the nation's central bank, intervened in the foreign exchange markets to maintain the Mexican peso's peg to the U.S. dollar by issuing dollar-denominated public debt to buy pesos. The peso's strength caused demand for imports to increase in Mexico, resulting in a trade deficit. Speculators recognized an overvalued peso and capital began flowing out of Mexico to the United States, increasing downward market pressure on the peso. Under election pressures, Mexico purchased its own treasury securities to maintain its money supply and avert rising interest rates, drawing down the bank's dollar reserves. Supporting the money supply by buying more dollar-denominated debt while simultaneously honoring such debt depleted the bank's reserves by the time Ernesto Zedillo, the winner of that year's presidential election, was inaugurated in early December 1994.

In late December 1994, the Bank of Mexico devalued the peso, and foreign investors' fear led to an even higher risk premium. To discourage the resulting capital flight, the bank raised interest rates, but higher costs of borrowing merely hurt economic growth. Unable to sell new issues of public debt or efficiently purchase dollars with devalued pesos, Mexico faced a default. Two days later, the bank allowed the peso to float freely, after which it continued to depreciate. The Mexican economy experienced inflation of around 52% and mutual funds began liquidating Mexican assets as well as emerging market assets in general. The effects spread to economies in Asia and the rest of Latin America. The United States organized a $50 billion bailout for Mexico in January 1995, administered by the International Monetary Fund (IMF) with the support of the G7 and Bank for International Settlements. In the aftermath of the crisis, several of Mexico's banks collapsed amidst widespread mortgage defaults. The Mexican economy experienced a severe recession and poverty and unemployment increased.

== Precursors ==
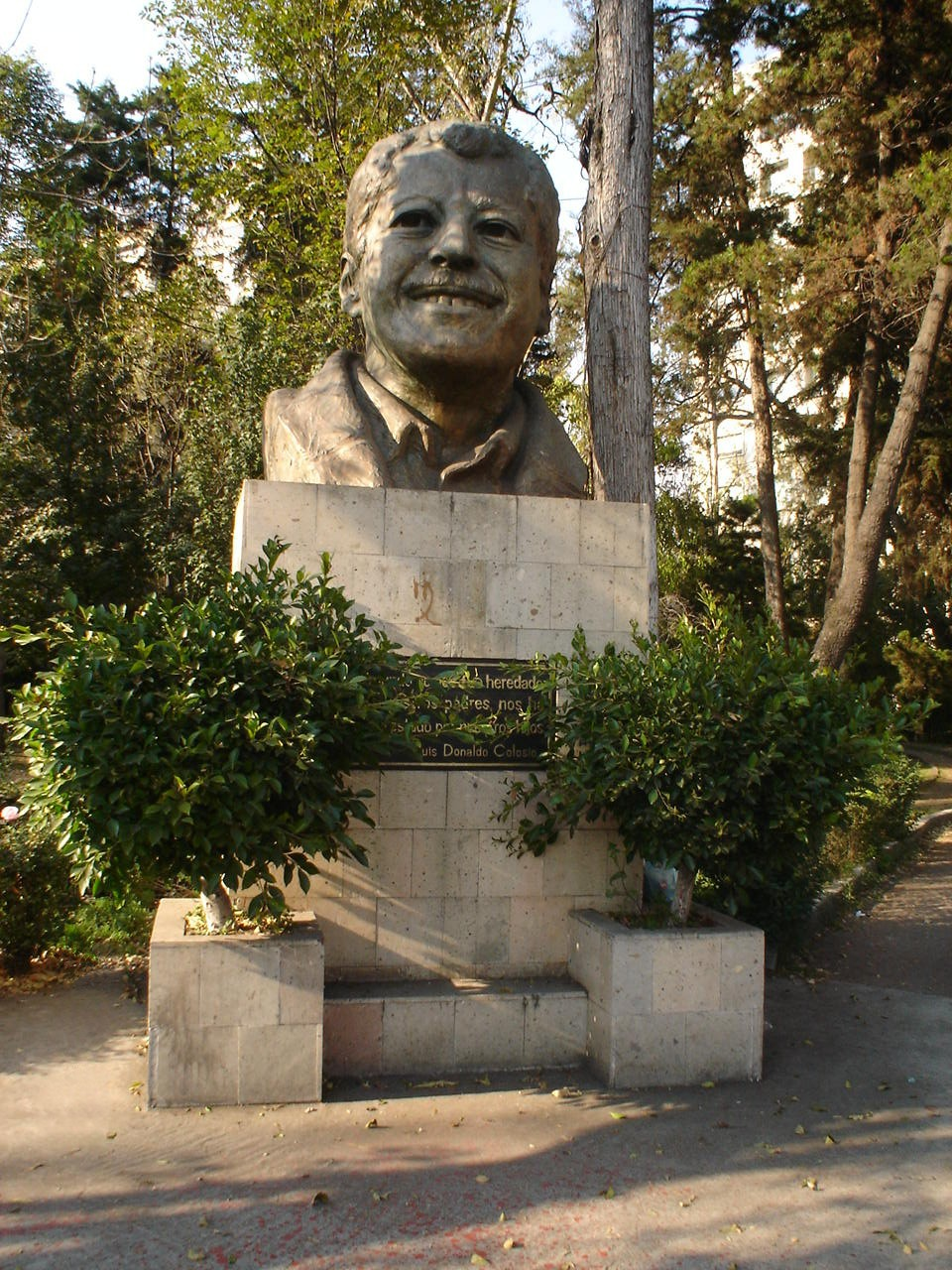
Monument to Luis Donaldo Colosio in Mexico City's Paseo de la Reforma.

With 1994 being the final year of his administration's sexenio (the country's six-year executive term limit), then-President Carlos Salinas de Gortari endorsed Luis Donaldo Colosio as the presidential candidate for his party, the Institutional Revolutionary Party's (PRI), in the general election. In accordance with party tradition during election years, Salinas began an unrecorded spending spree. Mexico's current account deficit grew to roughly 7% of GDP that same year, and Salinas allowed the Secretariat of Finance and Public Credit, Mexico's treasury, to issue short-term peso-denominated treasury bills with a guaranteed repayment denominated in U.S. dollars, called "tesobonos". These bills offered a lower yield than Mexico's traditional peso-denominated treasury bills, called "cetes", but their dollar-denominated returns were more attractive to foreign investors.

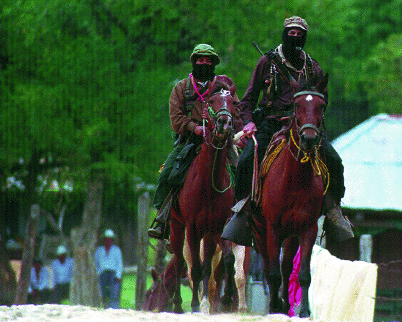
Zapatista Army of National Liberation (EZLN) insurgents in Mexico.

Investor confidence rose after the North American Free Trade Agreement (NAFTA) was signed. Upon NAFTA's entry into force on January 1, 1994, Mexican businesses as well as the Mexican government enjoyed access to new foreign capital thanks to foreign investors eager to lend more money. That year Chase Manhattan Bank alone held an estimated $1.5 billion in Mexican securities. International perceptions of the country's political risk began to shift, however, when the Zapatista Army of National Liberation declared war on the Mexican government and began a violent insurrection in Chiapas. Investors further questioned Mexico's political uncertainties and stability when PRI presidential candidate Luis Donaldo Colosio was assassinated while campaigning in Tijuana in March 1994, and began setting higher risk premia on Mexican financial assets. Higher risk premia initially had no effect on the peso's value because Mexico had a fixed exchange rate.

Banco de México, the central bank, maintained the peso's value through an exchange rate peg to the U.S. dollar, allowing the peso to appreciate or depreciate against the dollar within a narrow band. To accomplish this, the central bank would frequently intervene in the open markets and buy or sell pesos to maintain the peg. The central bank's intervention strategy partly involved issuing new short-term public debt instruments denominated in U.S. dollars. They then used the borrowed dollar capital to purchase pesos in the foreign exchange market, which, in turn, caused the peso to appreciate. The bank's purpose in mitigating the peso's depreciation was to protect against inflationary risks of having a markedly weaker domestic currency, but with the peso stronger than it ought to have been, domestic businesses and consumers began purchasing increasingly more imports, and Mexico began running a large trade deficit. Speculators began recognizing that the peso was artificially overvalued and led to speculative capital flight that further reinforced downward market pressure on the peso.

Mexico's central bank deviated from standard central banking policy when it fixed the peso to the dollar in 1988. Instead of allowing its monetary base to contract and its interest rates to rise, the central bank purchased treasury bills to prop up its monetary base and prevent rising interest rates—especially given that 1994 was an election year. Additionally, servicing the tesobonos with U.S. dollar repayments further drew down the central bank's foreign exchange reserves. Consistent with the macroeconomic trilemma in which a country with a fixed exchange rate and free flow of financial capital sacrifices monetary policy autonomy, the central bank's interventions to revalue the peso caused Mexico's money supply to contract (without an exchange rate peg, the currency would have been allowed to depreciate). The central bank's foreign exchange reserves began to dwindle and it completely ran out of U.S. dollars in December 1994.

== Crisis ==
On December 20, 1994, nineteen days after his inauguration, President Ernesto Zedillo announced the Mexican central bank's devaluation of the peso between 13% and 15%. The decision to devalue the peso after previous promises not to do so led investors to be skeptical of policymakers and fearful of additional devaluations. Investors flocked to foreign investments and placed even higher risk premia on domestic assets. This increase in risk premia placed additional upward market pressure on Mexican interest rates as well as downward market pressure on the Mexican peso. Foreign investors anticipating further currency devaluations began rapidly withdrawing capital from Mexican investments and selling off shares of stock as the Mexican Stock Exchange plummeted. To discourage such capital flight, particularly from debt instruments, the Mexican central bank raised interest rates, but higher borrowing costs ultimately hindered economic growth prospects.

When the time came for Mexico to roll over its maturing debt obligations, few investors were interested in purchasing new debt. To repay tesobonos, the central bank had little choice but to purchase dollars with its severely weakened pesos, which proved extremely expensive. The Mexican government faced an imminent sovereign default.

On December 22, the Mexican government allowed the peso to float, after which the peso depreciated another 15%. The value of the peso depreciated roughly 50% from approximately MX$3.40 to MX$7.20 per US dollar, recovering only to MX$5.80 per dollar four months later. Prices in Mexico rose by 24% over the same four months, and total inflation in 1995 was 52%. Mutual funds, which had invested in over $45 billion worth of Mexican assets in the several years leading up to the crisis, began liquidating their positions in Mexico and other developing countries. Foreign investors not only fled Mexico but emerging markets in general, and the crisis led to financial contagion throughout other financial markets in Asia and the Americas. US investors in Mexican securities risked losses of $8 to 10 billion. The impact of Mexico's crisis in Chile and Brazil became known as the "Tequila effect" (Spanish: efecto tequila).

== Bailout ==
In January 1995, U.S. President Bill Clinton held a meeting with newly confirmed U.S. Treasury Secretary Robert Rubin, U.S. Federal Reserve Chairman Alan Greenspan and then-Under Secretary for the Treasury Larry Summers to discuss an American response. According to Summers' recollection of the meeting:

Secretary Rubin set the stage for it briefly. Then, as was his way, he turned to someone else, namely me, to explain the situation in more detail and our proposal. And I said that I felt that $25 billion was required, and one of the President’s political advisers said, “Larry, you mean $25 million.” And I said, “No, I mean $25 billion.” ... There was a certain pall over the room, and one of his [Clinton's] other political advisers said, “Mr. President, if you send that money to Mexico and it doesn’t come back before 1996, you won’t be coming back after 1996.”

Clinton decided nevertheless to seek Congressional approval for a bailout and began working with Summers to secure commitments from Congress.

Motivated to deter a potential surge in illegal immigration and to mitigate the spread of investors' lack of confidence in Mexico to other developing countries, the United States coordinated a $50 billion bailout package in January 1995, to be administered by the IMF with support from the G7 and the Bank for International Settlements (BIS). The package established loan guarantees for Mexican public debt aimed at alleviating its growing risk premia and boosting investor confidence in its economy. The Mexican economy experienced a severe recession and the peso's value deteriorated substantially despite the bailout's success in preventing a worse collapse. Growth did not resume until the late 1990s.

The conditionality of the bailout required the Mexican government to institute new monetary and fiscal policy controls, although the country refrained from balance of payments reforms such as trade protectionism and strict capital controls to avoid violating its commitments under NAFTA. The loan guarantees allowed Mexico to restructure its short-term public debt and improve market liquidity. Of the approximately $50 billion assembled in the bailout, $20 billion was contributed by the United States, $17.8 billion by the IMF, $10 billion by the BIS, $1 billion by a consortium of Latin American nations, and CAD$1 billion by Canada.

The Clinton administration's efforts to organize a bailout for Mexico were met with difficulty. It drew criticism from members of the U.S. Congress as well as scrutiny from the news media. The administration's position centered on three principal concerns: potential unemployment in the United States in the event Mexico would have to reduce its imports of U.S. goods (at the time, Mexico was the third-largest consumer of U.S. exports); political instability and violence in a neighboring country; and a potential surge in illegal immigration from Mexico. Some congressional representatives agreed with American economist and former chairman of the Federal Deposit Insurance Corporation, L. William Seidman, that Mexico should just negotiate with creditors without involving the United States, especially in the interest of deterring moral hazard. On the other hand, supporters of U.S. involvement such as Fed Chair Alan Greenspan argued that the fallout from a Mexican sovereign default would be so devastating that it would far exceed the risks of moral hazard.

Following the U.S. Congress's failure to pass the Mexican Stabilization Act, the Clinton administration reluctantly approved an initially dismissed proposal to designate funds from the U.S. Treasury's Exchange Stabilization Fund as loan guarantees for Mexico. These loans returned a profit of $600 million and were even repaid ahead of maturity. Then-U.S. Treasury Secretary Robert Rubin's appropriation of funds from the Exchange Stabilization Fund in support of the Mexican bailout was scrutinized by the United States House Committee on Financial Services, which expressed concern about a potential conflict of interest because Rubin had formerly served as co-chair of the board of directors of Goldman Sachs, which had a substantial share in distributing Mexican stocks and bonds.

== Economic impacts ==
Mexico's economy experienced a severe recession as a result of the peso's devaluation and the flight to safer investments. The country's GDP declined by 6.2% over the course of 1995. Mexico's financial sector bore the brunt of the crisis as banks collapsed, revealing low-quality assets and fraudulent lending practices. Thousands of mortgages went into default as Mexican citizens struggled to keep pace with rising interest rates, resulting in widespread repossession of houses.

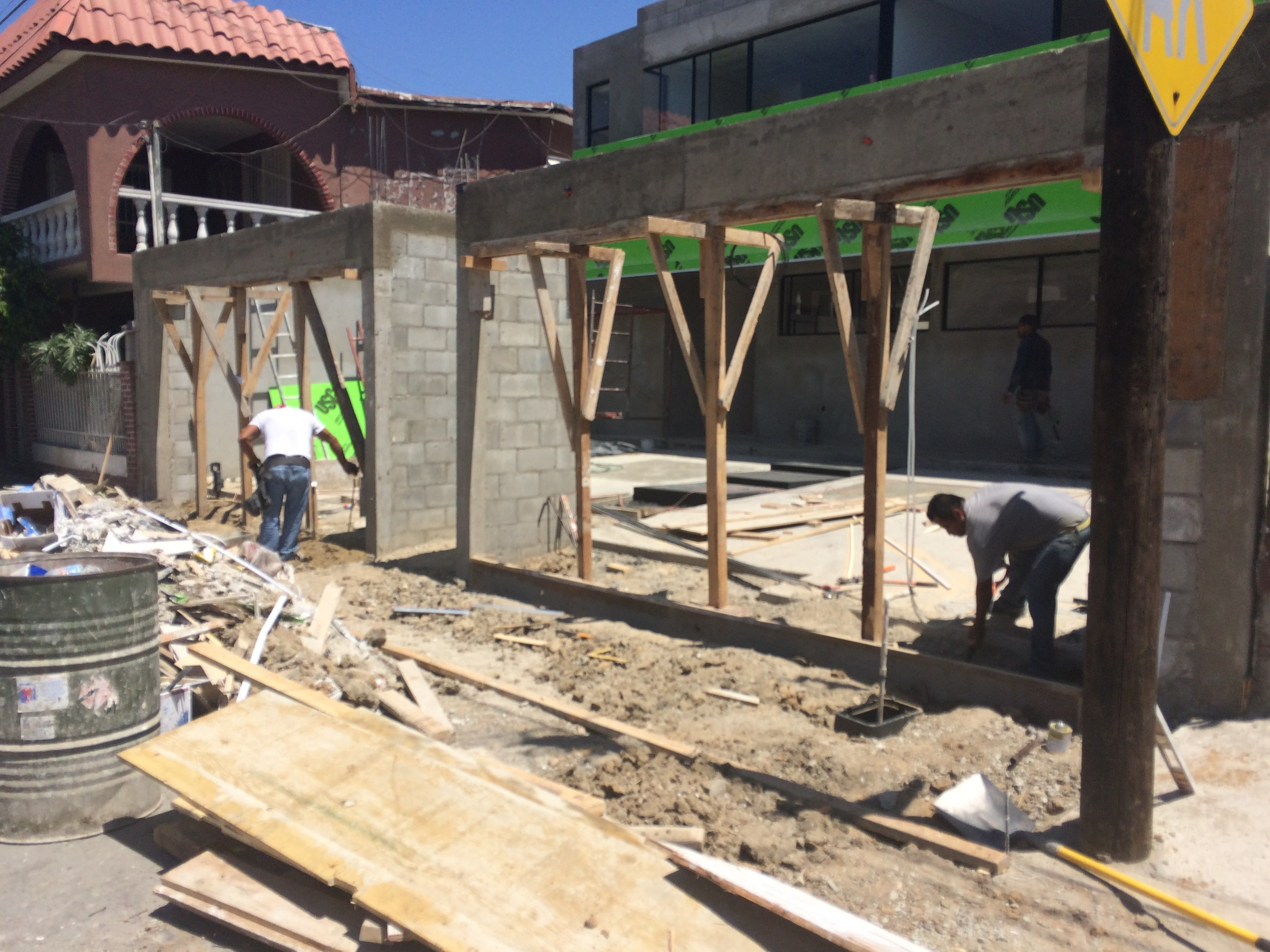
Construction workers working on a residential building in Tijuana, Mexico.

In addition to declining GDP growth, Mexico experienced severe inflation and extreme poverty skyrocketed as real wages plummeted and unemployment nearly doubled. Prices increased by 35% in 1995. Nominal wages were sustained, but real wages fell by 25-35% over the same year. Unemployment climbed to 7.4% in 1995 from its pre-crisis level of 3.9% in 1994. In the formal sector alone, over one million people lost their jobs and average real wages decreased by 13.5% throughout 1995. Overall household incomes plummeted by 30% in the same year. Mexico's extreme poverty grew to 37% in 1996 from 21% in 1994, undoing the previous ten years of successful poverty reduction initiatives. The nation's poverty levels would not begin returning to normal until 2001.

Mexico's growing poverty affected urban areas more intensely than rural areas, in part due to the urban population's sensitivity to labor market volatility and macroeconomic conditions. Urban citizens relied on a healthy labor market, access to credit, and consumer goods. Consumer price inflation and a tightening credit market during the crisis proved challenging for urban workers, while rural households shifted to subsistence agriculture. Mexico's gross income per capita decreased by only 17% in agriculture, contrasted with 48% in the financial sector and 35% in the construction and commerce industries. Average household consumption declined by 15% from 1995 to 1996 with a shift in composition toward essential goods. Households saved less and spent less on healthcare. Expatriates living abroad increased remittances to Mexico, evidenced by average net unilateral transfers doubling between 1994 and 1996.

Households' lower demand for primary healthcare led to a 7% hike in mortality rates among infants and children in 1996 (from 5% in 1995). Infant mortality increased until 1997, most dramatically in regions where women had to work as a result of economic need.

Critical scholars contend that the 1994 Mexican peso crisis exposed the problems of Mexico’s shift to the neoliberal Washington consensus approach to development. Notably, the crisis revealed the problems of a privatized banking sector within a liberalized yet internationally subordinate economy that is dependent on foreign flows of finance capital.

== See also ==
- Economic history of Mexico
- 1998 Russian financial crisis
- Great Recession
- Latin American economy
- Sudden stop (economics)
