= Next Generation EU =

COVID-19 support funding

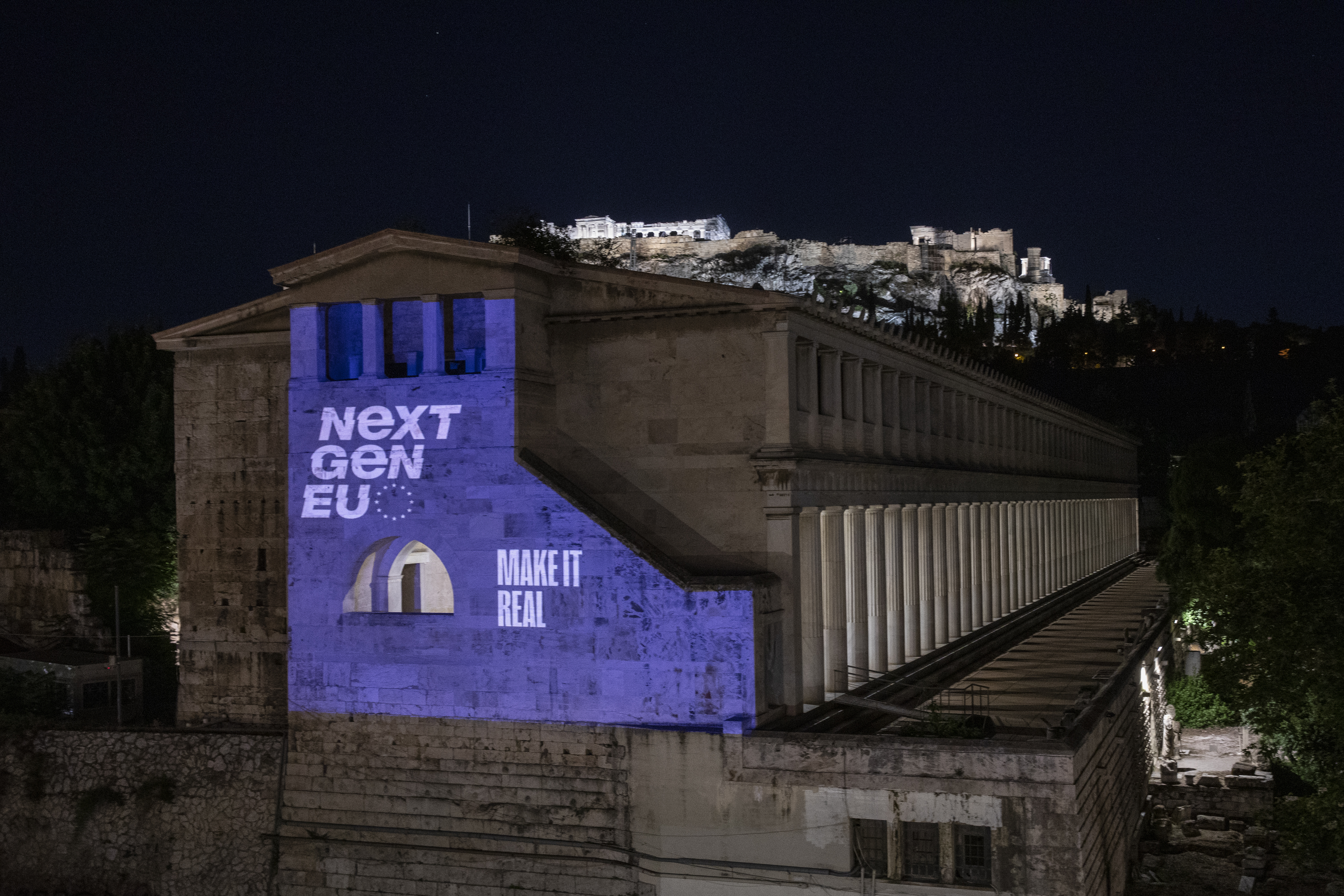
The ancient Roman Agora in Athens illuminated with a Next Generation EU sign

Next Generation EU (NGEU) is a European Commission economic recovery package to support the EU member states to recover from the COVID-19 pandemic, in particular those that have been particularly hard hit. It is sometimes styled NextGenerationEU and Next Gen EU, and also called the European Union Recovery Instrument. Agreed in principle by the European Council on 21 July 2020 and adopted on 14 December 2020, the instrument is worth €750 billion roughly equally split between grants and loans. NGEU will operate from 2021 to 2026, and will be tied to the regular 2021–2027 budget of the EU's Multiannual Financial Framework (MFF). Money borrowed by the EU to fund the grants will be repaid using EU's own resources until 2058. The comprehensive NGEU and MFF packages are projected to reach €1824.3 billion, so NGEU effectively doubles the EU budget while operational. It is a revolutionary EU instrument in many aspects: size (the largest EU fund so far), leverage of the grants for reforms, and novel methods of financing and grant allocation.

The program is very large (just the grant portion of NGEU is twice the amount the Marshall Plan aid) and redistributive (NGEU favors the south of the block: Italy and Spain get the largest shares, while Greece is the leader in per-capita allocations, at almost 20% of its GDP). The grant portion of NGEU is approximately 3% of EU's GDP. Similar to the Marshall plan, NGEU is conditional, however it targets investment and public services, not stabilizing the budgets and promoting trade. 37% of the funds are intended for the green transition and additional 20% for digital economy.

== Background ==
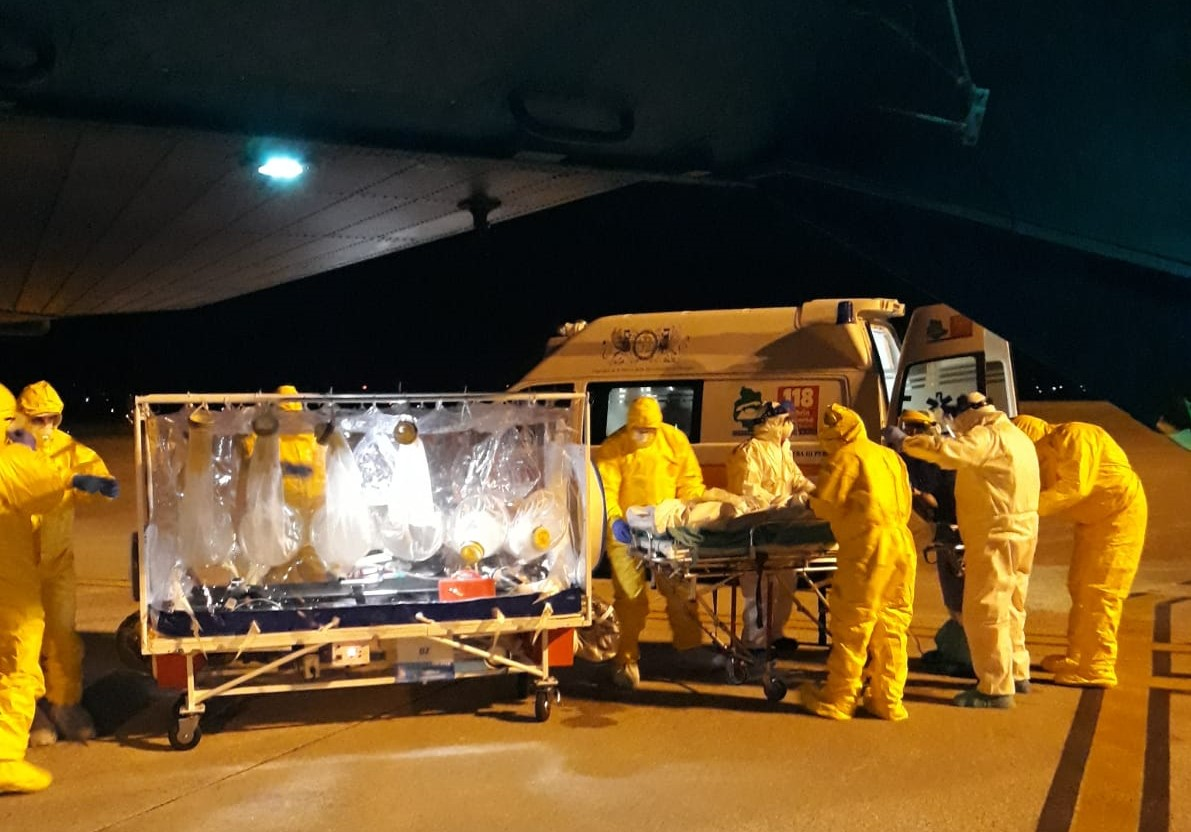
Paramedics carrying a patient under biocontainment in Italy

Europe was struck by its initial wave of the COVID-19 pandemic in March 2020. The first-hit and the hardest-hit country in the EU was Italy, which promptly placed its contaminated zones in lockdown, putting health concerns over financial ones. Gradually, the other member states encountered the first wave of the pandemic; and by 17 March 2020, all member states had reported cases of COVID-19. The rapidity of response depended on the country: most member states were initially hesitant, not wanting to close everything or impose a nationwide lockdown, fearing that that would cripple the economy; but two weeks after the first confirmed cases, most countries had secured their borders and imposed travel restrictions. The propagation of the COVID-19 virus across Europe plunged the continent into a deep economic crisis, and national economies were struggling due to the widespread lockdowns. From mid-March 2020, all member states saw their national debt and public spending rise, mainly due to increasing expenditures on healthcare and measures to cope with the economic crisis. In general, most member states adopted similar measures to address the economic crisis, by providing substantial aid packages to businesses and enterprises.

Gradually, EU institutions agreed to adopt further measures to tackle the economic crisis and help the member states. In mid-March, Christine Lagarde, President of the European Central Bank (ECB), adopted the Pandemic Emergency Purchase Program (PEPP), a temporary purchase program of €750 billion to deal with the pandemic emergency. The ECB's Governing Council established that the purchases were to be made to the extent they were "necessary and proportionate" to achieve the "objectives of the mandate". On 4 June 2020, the ECB decided to extend this program and added €600 billion to it, for a total of €1350 billion. On 19 March 2020, the European Commission adopted a temporary framework that allowed member states flexibility to support their national economies with state recovery packages, followed two days later by the ECB's Governing Council's agreeing to more flexible fiscal rules "by initiating the general escape clause of the stability and growth pact". On 15 May, the European Stability Mechanism (ESM) also stepped in and created the "pandemic crisis support".

After a while, it became clear that the different measures implemented were not enough to fight the economic crisis caused by the pandemic; debates on how to deal with the situation led to a confrontation between northern and southern member states. Italian Prime Minister Giuseppe Conte, backed by Spanish Prime Minister Pedro Sanchez, proposed corona bonds as a measure to recover from the crisis, consisting of the creation of joint public debt at the union level, and thus establish a solidarity mechanism for the redistribution of debt between the states. This measure was endorsed by 7 other member states: France, Belgium, Greece, Portugal, Ireland, Slovenia, and Luxembourg. However, the Frugal Four (Austria, Sweden, the Netherlands, and Denmark) led by Germany refused this proposition, scared that they would have to repay the debt in case of default. The leap forward was made by the Franco-German axis, when on 18 May 2020 they came up with a proposed aid package of €500 billion in grants, which would give liquidity to the member states affected by the crisis. This "Recovery Fund" package would be established by the European Commission, which would borrow the money from financial markets, incorporate it into the EU budget, and distribute it to the member states. On 27 May 2020, the Commission presented the "Next Generation EU" plan, a proposal worth €750 billion, a middle ground between the €1000 billion asked by the most hit countries, such as Italy and Spain, and the €500 billion proposed by France and Germany. This huge recovery fund would be integrated into the EU budget which would total €1.85 trillion.

Regardless of the first failed attempt, at the European Council meeting on 17 July 2020, an agreement upon the recovery package and the MFF 2021–2027 was reached. Nevertheless, some issues, addressed in the upcoming Council meetings, were still present. In the first place, the Frugal Four wanted to reduce the amount of grants and asked for stronger conditionality for the expenditure of the funds. Furthermore, there were concerns about which programs to fund: the Frugal Four wanted more funds for R&D, Digital Economy, and green investments, while the Friends of Cohesion (Southern and Eastern European member states) wanted the allocation to Cohesion Funds to be the same. Lastly, there were problems linked to the "rule of law" conditionality. Finally, on 10 November 2020, the European Parliament and the Council reached a definitive agreement which integrates the 2021–27 MFF of €1074.3 billion and the temporary instrument for recovery of Next Generation EU of €750 billion. The deadline for the presentation of national plans was 30 April 2021. Even though proposals were already sent to the commission in mid-October 2020, those proposals will help the Commission understand in which direction the member states are going and eventually re-orient and assist the national governments with modifications.

== The NGEU agreement ==
=== The objectives of the agreement ===
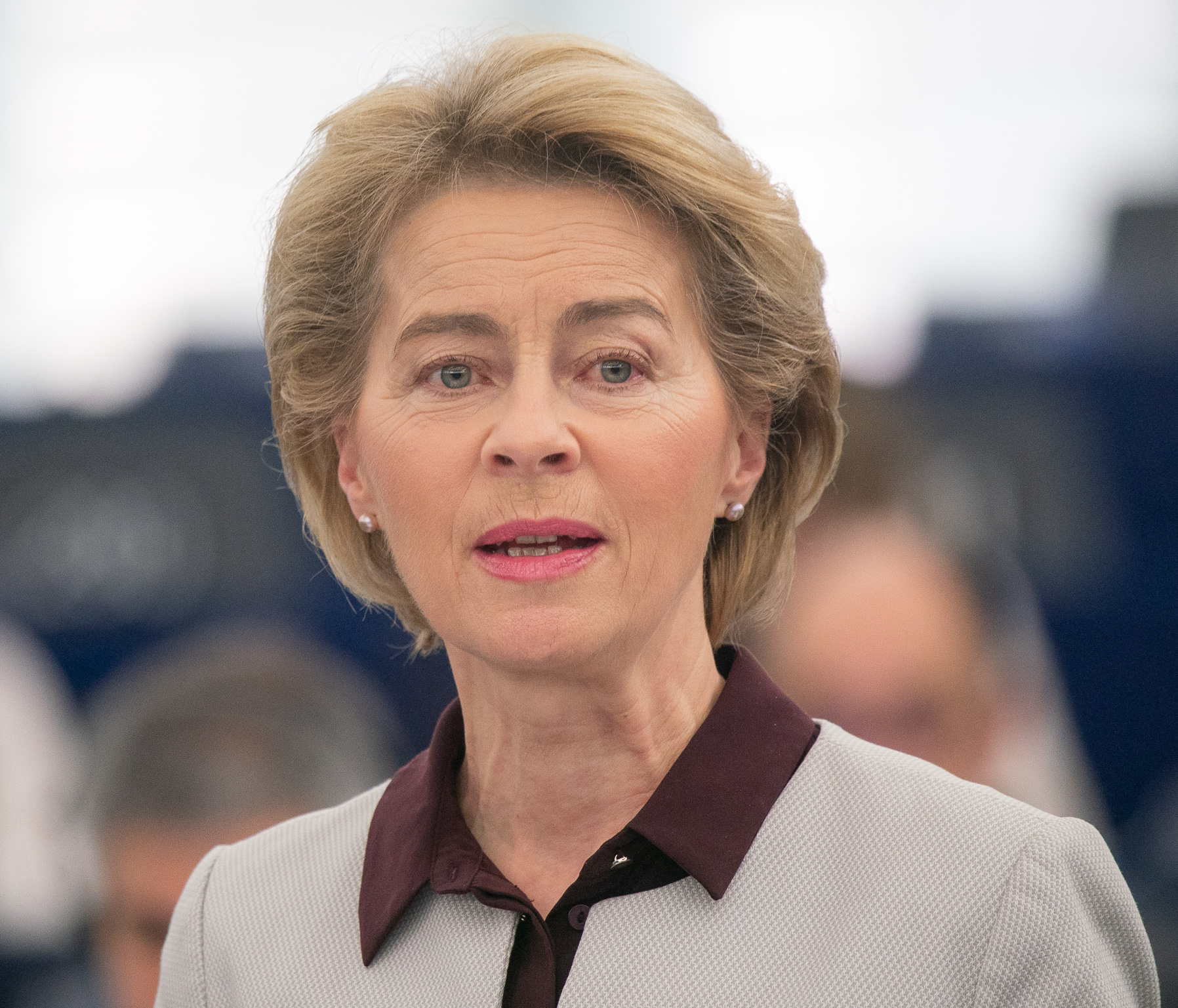
Commission President Ursula von der Leyen in 2020

The Next Generation EU (NGEU) – €360 billion in loans and €390 billion in grants – is a break from the austerity policy adopted after the 2008 financial crisis as the EU's main response to economic crises. The NGEU, adopted in conjunction with the 2021–2027 Multiannual Financial Framework (MFF), demonstrates that the EU member states can collectively agree on policy, along with funding, to tackle large-scale crises.

The EU launched the COVID-19 recovery plan with several objectives. The primary objective is to help its member states repair the immediate economic and social damages caused by the coronavirus pandemic, and, additionally, to prepare a better future for the next European generation.

Secondly, alongside tackling the economic and social impacts of the COVID-19 pandemic, the plan has other objectives. It also aims to assist the green transition; digital transformation; smart, sustainable, and inclusive growth and jobs; social and territorial cohesion; health and resilience; and policies for the next generation, including enhancing education and skills.

The third objective is modernising the European economy. Therefore, more than 50 percent of the funds will be spent on modernization: such as research and innovation via Horizon Europe; fair climate and digital transitions via the Just Transition Fund; the Digital Europe Programme; preparedness, recovery, and resilience via the Recovery and Resilience Facility, rescEU; and a new health program, EU4Health.

In addition to the aforementioned objectives, the package also focuses on modernizing traditional policies, such as cohesion and the common agricultural policy, on maximizing their contribution to the Union's priorities, fighting climate change—with 30% of the EU funds, the highest share ever of the European budge—biodiversity protection, and gender equality. Thus, it plans to strengthen the EU's Single Market and invest in shared European priorities.

More broadly, the EU Next Generation agreement consists of the following objectives:

1. To support the member states through investments and reforms:
  A new Recovery and Resilience Facility, worth €560 billion, will offer financial support for investments and reforms, including green and digital transitions, the resilience of national economies, and linking them to EU priorities. This facility will be endowed with a grant of up to €310 billion, and loans of up to €250 billion can be obtained. Support will be provided by all member states, but will be concentrated where needs are greatest.
  By 2022, under the new REACT-EU initiative, €55 billion will be allocated, in addition, to the cohesion policy program, based on the seriousness of the socio-economic impacts of the crisis and the relative well-being of the member states.
  In addition to the Just Transition Fund, up to €40 billion will be proposed to help member states accelerate their transition to climate neutrality.
  An additional budget of €15 billion will be provided for the European Rural Development Fund, to support rural areas in making the necessary structural changes in line with the European Green Deal and achieving ambitious targets in line with the new biodiversity and Farm to Fork strategies.
2. To stimulate the EU economy by encouraging private investment:
  A new Solvency Support Instrument will mobilize private resources to urgently support sustainable European companies in the most affected areas. It can be operational from 2020 and will have a budget of €31 billion aimed at providing €300 billion in insolvency support for companies operating in all economic sectors and to prepare for a cleaner, digital, and flexible future.
  InvestEU, Europe's flagship investment program, will be raised to €15.3 billion to stimulate private investment in the projects of the Union.
  A new Strategic Investment Facility of up to €150 billion will be generated under InvestEU to increase the resilience of strategic sectors, especially those linked to the green and digital transition, and key-value chains in the domestic market, thanks to the €15 billion contribution from NGEU.
3. Measures to prevent lessons learned from the crisis from happening again:
  With a budget of €9.4 billion, a new Health Program, EU4Health, will be organized to strengthen health security and prepare for future health crises. With an additional budget of €2 billion, the Union's Civil Protection Mechanism will be expanded and strengthened to equip the Union to prepare for and respond to future crises. A budget of €94.4 billion will be provided for Horizon Europe to support vital research in health, resilience, and green and digital transitions. Europe's global partners will receive €16.5 billion in support of additional external action, including humanitarian aid. Other EU programs will be strengthened to fully align the future financial framework with recovery needs and strategic priorities. Other tools will be strengthened to make the EU budget more flexible and responsive.
  Moreover, fighting climate change appeared to be one of the most crucial objectives of the NGEU. The EU Commission issued a rule that at least 37% of the Recovery and Resilience Plans proposed by member states must allocated to climate change-related projects.
  One of the aims of this agreement is to deepen the Economic and Monetary Union. After years of recovery, the European economy, employment, growth, and investment are all settling on a stable footing, returning to pre-crisis levels or better. Public finances continue to improve, and the banking system and the foundations of the Economic and Monetary Union are stronger. Therefore, the EU is prioritizing the further deepening of the Economic and Monetary Union by providing a Budgetary Instrument for Convergence and Competitiveness for the euro area, supporting member states' growth reforms and investment by taking full advantage of the flexibility allowed within the Stability and Growth Pact, focusing on completing the Banking Union, and strengthening the currency's international role.

=== EU revenue sources ===
To finance NextGenerationEU, the European Commission – on behalf of the European Union – is borrowing on the markets at more favourable rates than most Member States and redistributes the amounts.

==== Bonds issuance ====
With respect to the first mechanism, the European Commission clearly assumes a key role in ensuring long-term sound financing of the stimulus plan. In the wake of the EU leaders' summit held in July 2020, the European Commission got the mandate to issue up to €750 billion of debt on the international capital markets on behalf of the 27 member states of the European Union. This joint issuance of common debt bonds is not the first in European history but it has never been done so on such a large scale. According to the European Council conclusions, the net borrowing operations are scheduled to end by 2026 whereas the deadline for paying back the due loans and interest rates is set not later than 31 December 2058. In this way, the common bonds are deemed to constitute triple-A-rated debt security by international investors and several credit rating agencies whose interest is to buy safe assets bonds: thanks to this, the European Commission benefits from lower interest rates compared to member states, notably those that show higher borrowing costs.

In practice, to make the Next Generation EU Agreement feasible, the European Commission needs to modify the Decision on the system of Own Resources of the European Union, commonly known as the Own Resources Decision which defines how the EU budget is financed every year. The amendment entails two major changes: (1) the Own Resources ceiling is increased by 0.6%; (2) the headroom envisaged in the Decision is subject to an additional expansion in quantitative terms.

The headroom of the EU budget is the margin between the Own Resources ceiling of the long-term budget and expenditures during the same period. The importance of the headroom rests on the fact that it is necessary in order for the EU to meet in full all its financial obligations and liabilities, even in case of economic recession. Otherwise, the EU would no longer be able to preserve its high credit rating with international investors, which would trigger a general rise in borrowing costs.

Following Council Decision 2020/2053, the increment in the own resources ceiling is intended to be applied exclusively for the purpose of addressing the COVID-19 crisis. This means that the new Own Resources ceiling exceeds the previous one in nominal terms: the former indeed amounted to 1.40% of the sum of all member states' Gross National Incomes (GNI). Instead, the current ceiling enforced after the new regulation sets a higher limit that corresponds to 2.00% of the EU Gross National Income. The EU Decision foresaw that once the money borrowed and loans will be completely repaid the newly expanded ceiling will be lowered to the pre-existing level of 1.40% of the total EU GNI.

==== Additional sources of revenue ====
The revenue sources of the EU annual budget represent the other mechanism through which the Next Generation EU Agreement is to be funded over the implementation years. Until 2020, the sources of income of the EU budget have been basically three: traditional own resources, VAT-based own resources, and GNI-based contributions.

Prior to the COVID-19 pandemic, discussions on the introduction of a new system of own resources have taken place at the European level. However, national authorities were hesitant to provide new sources of income. The withdrawal of the United Kingdom and the increasing financial needs of the Union paved the way for reform, based on the inclusion of new tax-based resources. Consequently, in May 2018 the European Commission published a proposal for the amendment of the Union's own resources system to introduce a basket of additional resources, notably the Common Consolidated Tax Base, the EU Emission Trading System, and a tax on non-recycling plastic packaging waste. The subsequent debates at the council made visible the strong preference for the adoption of a plastic tax to be included in the MFF 2021–2027 which complements the pre-existing one, and it is deemed to be the precursor of broader reform.

To cope with the economic consequences of the coronavirus pandemic, the July 2020 special meeting of the European Council advocated for speeding up the reform, with the intention to facilitate debt repayment raised under the framework of the Next Generation EU agreement and to relieve budgetary stresses faced by the member states.

Moreover, the July 2020 European Council approved reforming its own resources system by providing a detailed roadmap. To pay back part of the massive financing, the following new resources have been foreseen:

- Carbon Border Adjustment Mechanism (CBAM), according to which goods will be taxed in relation to the CO_{2} footprint released during their production.
- Digital Tax on large digital corporations whose turnover is over €750 million worldwide and at least €50 million within the EU.
- Revision of the ETS scheme that could be extended to the aviation and maritime sector.
- Financial Transaction Tax: to ensure a fair contribution of the financial sector to national tax revenues through the imposition of a tax rate on certain transactions and derivatives.

As stated in the European Council conclusions, the European Commission is required to deliver its proposal for the adoption of further sources of revenues in line with a specific timeline roadmap: by June 2021 proposals on the CBAM, digital levy, and ETS reform have to be submitted. Thereafter, the council will decide no later than January 2023. In a second step, the commission will oversee additional proposals upon the inclusion of a Financial Transaction Tax and a common corporate tax based on large companies whose operations benefit from the Single Market. These two levies will be examined by the Council no later than 1 July 2025.

As of 30 April 2021, the only new source of resources created is the tax on non-recycling plastic packaging wasted that was adopted at the European Council meeting on 10–11 December 2020.

=== Recovery plans and funding ===
The European Union has adopted a recovery fund of €750 billion, of which €390 billion will be in the form of grants and the rest in the form of loans for the period 2021–2026, which will be financed by issuing a common debt. Next Generation EU is a temporary instrument designed to help repair the immediate economic and social damage caused by the COVID-19 pandemic. With these funds, Europe wants to be greener, more digital, and more resilient to better adapt to current and future challenges. This recovery plan would complement the measures agreed by the Eurogroup for a total of €540 billion in support of health spending, unemployment and short-time work, and credit to the private sector. The important element remains the Recovery and Resilience Mechanism (RRF), which amounts to €672.5 billion between grants and loans to support investment and reforms, with a focus on the ecological and digital transition.

- Recovery and Resilience Facility: this largest component has €672.5 billion of funding in the form of loans and grants. The objective is to mitigate the economic and social consequences of the pandemic, allowing European economies to be more resilient and better prepared for the challenges of ecological and digital transitions.
- Support for Cohesion and Territories in Europe (REACT-EU): this component has a budget of €47.5 billion. This is a new initiative to put in place crisis response measures to address the consequences of crises, to contribute to a green, digital, and resilient economic recovery.
- NextGenerationEU will also bring additional funds to other European programmes or funds such as Horizon 2020, InvestEU, Rural Development, and the Just Transition Fund (FTJ). Horizon 2020 implements the Innovation Union to ensure Europe's global competitiveness. This program is seen to stimulate economic growth and create jobs; it guarantees €80 billion of funding. The European Union wants to promote recovery, green growth, and employment by supporting investments that bring visible progress, hence the InvestEU program. This plan is intended to generate more than €372 billion of additional investment. In addition, supporting an economy in rural areas that promotes rural development (FEADER) is also essential. Indeed, FEADER's budget amounts to €95.5 billion and includes a contribution from NextGenerationEU to help meet the challenges posed by the pandemic. Lastly, the Just Transition Fund (FTJ) is a cohesion policy instrument to support a transition to climate neutrality, and will support all member states.

Total grants and loans per topic (in € billion, 2018)
Topics	Total allocations
1. Single market, innovation and digital	10.6
2. Cohesion, resilience and values	721.9
3. Natural resources and environment	17.5
Total	750 billion

Total grants and loans per programme, facility, or fund (in € billion, 2018)
Programme	Total allocations
Recovery and Resilience Facility	672.5 (loans: 360 – grants: 312.5)
REACT-EU (regional cohesion)	47.5
Horizon Europe (research and innovation)	5.0
InvestEU	5.6
European Agricultural Fund for Rural Development	7.5
Just Transition Fund (climate-neutral economy)	10.0
RescEU (disaster relief and emergency reserves)	1.9
Total	750 billion

Total grants pre-allocated (Note: The pre-allocated grants form the reserved funds for each member state. A minority of the grants, and all loans, are only allocated upon request or according to policy.) to all member states (in € billion, 2021)
Facility	Total allocations
Recovery and Resilience Facility	338.0 (maximum)
REACT-EU	39.8
Just Transition Fund	18.9 (Note: Estimate of current total allocation based on the 2018 figures, compensated for inflation by applying a customary 2% fixed deflator. See the Recovery and Resilience Facility reference for more information. All other numbers in these tables are official 2018 or 2021 figures.)
European Agricultural Fund for Rural Development	8.1
Total	379.3 billion

To finance this recovery plan, the commission will borrow on the markets at favourable rates and redistribute the amounts. The commission will use a diversified financing strategy to raise up to €800 billion (5% of EU GDP) until 2026 for NextGenerationEU. Indeed, the commission will issue bonds to finance loans to the EU and to third countries under four programs, but it will also issue bonds to finance the NextGenerationEU program.

1. Funding strategies:

The funding strategy combines the use of different funding instruments and techniques with open and transparent communication to market participants. It will allow the European Commission to raise the necessary amounts in an efficient and seamless manner. This strategy combines:

- an annual borrowing decision: this will provide transparency and predictability to investors;
- structured and transparent relationships, with the bank supporting the program;
- multiple funding instruments, to access the market and manage liquidity needs;
- a combination of auctions and syndications, to ensure cost-effective access to financing.

2. Funding instruments:

In order to successfully implement the recovery plan, the commission is issuing 3-to-30-year bonds. EU-Bonds are the main means to implement a financing plan. The NextGenerationEU program will give the commission the opportunity to consolidate debt with EU-Bonds. Second, the commission will issue shorter-term securities, known as EU-Bills. These securities will provide access to the money market and the ability to determine the size of each transaction. Finally, private placements of EU-Bonds involve placing small amounts with investors from different institutions.

3. Funding plans:

The commission will annually publish borrowing decisions and semi-annual funding plans. This is essential to ensure sound financial management where transparency towards the Parliament and the council is elementary. On the one hand, the annual borrowing decisions will set a maximum for the operations planned over a period of one year and will fix the amounts of short- and long-term financing. On the other hand, the semi-annual funding plans will indicate the borrowings to be carried out during the next six months and will aim to guarantee the availability of funds to cover payment needs. The commission will thus publish the targeted amounts to be financed and the auction dates.

=== Rule of law ===
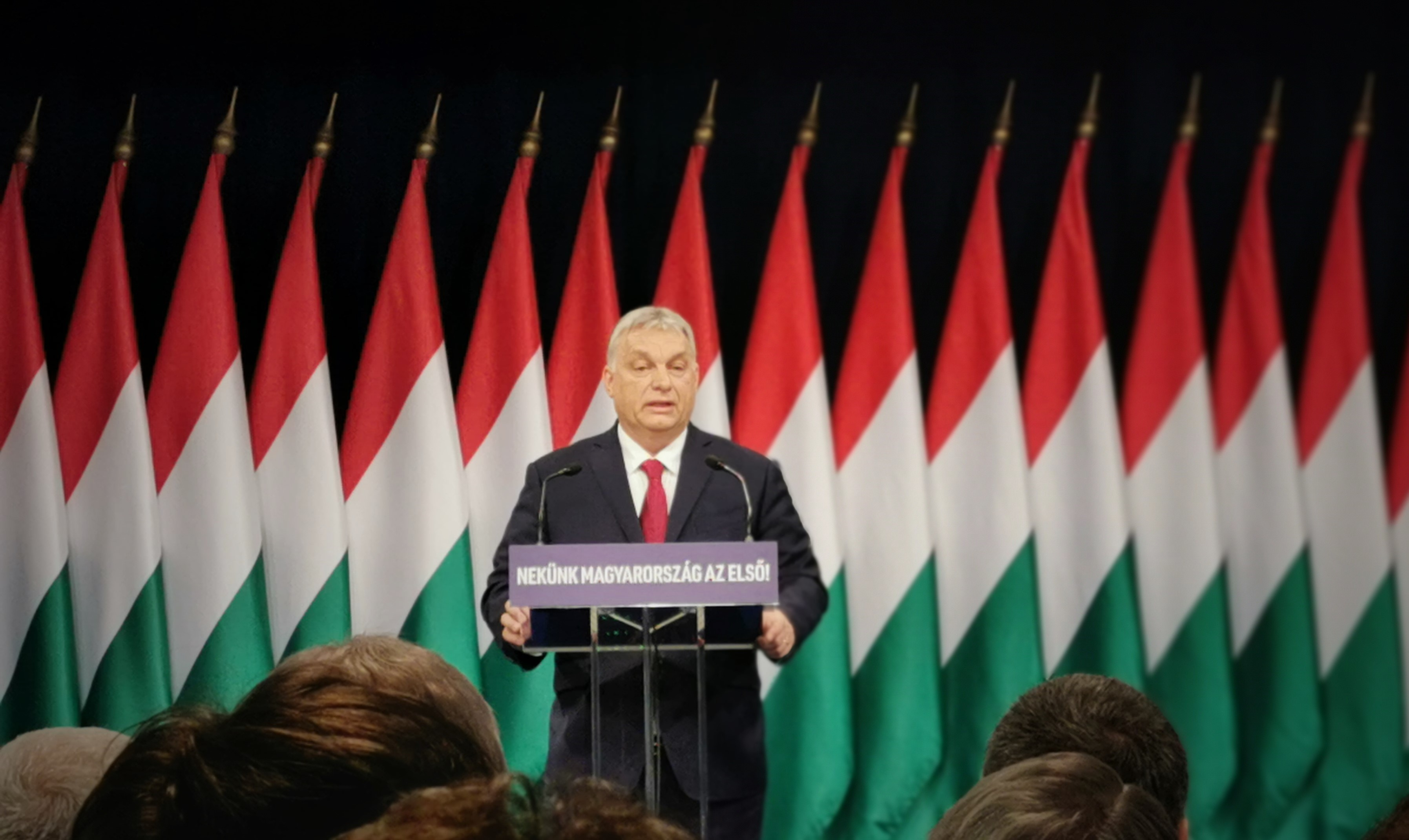
Hungary's prime minister Viktor Orbán harshly criticised the "rule of law" regulation.

The Next Generation EU recovery plan is one of the most ambitious projects where the finances are associated with risk. The main concern was to focus on member states that want to benefit from the NGEU recovery project, but which have governmental corruption and fail to comply with the rule of law. It creates huge dissatisfaction amongst EU authorities disbursing EU funds where there is a lack of effective mechanisms to enforce the rule of law.

In 2020, Poland and Hungary continued to oppose the rule of law mechanism linked to the EU's 7-year budget. The rule of law is a foundational requirement, it basically requires each country to have an independent judiciary, to allow the media to be free, to have a clear separation of powers between the legislature and the judiciary. The principle of rule of law is fundamental to any state's democratic system in the EU. However, in Poland and Hungary, after initially complying with the rule of law when becoming part of the Union, such compliance has deteriorated. In these countries there have been attempts to control the judiciary, attacks on the media, and violations of LGBTQ and Women's Rights.

Article 7 of the Treaty on European Union allows investigation of the member states that don't comply with the rule of law and subsequent levying of sanctions. Article 7 investigations were opened against Poland and then Hungary; so far without recommendations, the reason being that all the countries of the EU, except the member state being investigated, have to agree. In this case, Hungary threatened to veto sanctions against Poland and Poland did likewise for Hungary, each protecting the other. There were negotiations on a new rule of law mechanism, to make the disbursement of EU fund conditional upon the respect of rule of law. However, Poland and Hungary received funds for years, despite the alleged violating the rule of law. To adapt to the situation, there is a need to implement qualified majority voting (QMV) to prevent Hungary's and Poland's being able to veto sanctions.

However, things are more complicated because the rule of law mechanism together with the Next Generation recovery plan is part of the new European 7-year budget cycle, and it is in relation to that where unanimity is required. That's where Poland and Hungary have been pausing the process. Their veto has politically blocked the entering into force of the Next Generation EU recovery fund and the disbursement of funds all across the EU.

The EU faces a dilemma. Germany and a few other countries are trying to find a compromise; but most EU governments are against compromise. There are a few other options. One is the possibility of adopting the new mechanism and EU recovery plan through an alternative process to exclude Hungary and Poland from benefiting from recovery funds. There are controversies about what are the possible options, and it is not clear how this deadlock will be resolved. In the meantime, there is a delay of disbursements of funds as well as enacting the EU budget itself. In case of reaching an agreement, Hungary would receive €11 billion, and Poland €40 billion. Since the Polish and Hungarian governments foresaw their positions would lead them to lose out on EU funding, they decided to hold the entire budget to ransom – including the COVID-19 recovery plan.

=== National Recovery and Resilience Plan approval ===
To receive support in the form of grants and loans from the Recovery and Resilience Facility (RRF) for the period 2021–2026, member states need to submit National Recovery and Resilience Plans (NRRP), which shall include targets, milestones, and estimated costs. Eventually, the European Council, by qualified majority vote, will approve or disapprove the plans.

The NRRP must outline how each member state intends to use these investments to contribute to the green and digital priorities foreseen by the commission. To do so, two targets have been set: 37% of the spending must be channeled to green, and 21% to digital related, actions. Member states must comply with the objective of EU climate neutrality by 2050.

The deadline for submission of the Recovery and Resilience plans was 30 April 2021. Member states were encouraged to submit a preliminary draft plan from 15 October 2020.

=== Climate action ===
The European Commission intends to strongly link the European recovery plan to the need to fight climate change, with the objective of reducing greenhouse gas emissions by supporting the energy and ecological transition sectors with the rationale of, in the words of Ursula Von der Leyen, "build[ing] a Green Europe, which protects our climate and our environment and which creates sustainable jobs."

A target of 30% of expenditures from the MFF and NGEU will be applied to climate-change initiatives, in compliance with the Paris climate accord and in line with the objectives of the European Green Deal, the flagship initiative to address the climate emergency that seeks to make of the EU the global leader on climate change and achieve carbon neutrality by 2050. Regarding the NGEU, this share now amounts to 37% of the total amount, following the agreement reached on 18 December 2020 between the European Parliament and the Council of the Union on the scope of the different dimensions of the Recovery and Resilience Facility (RRF).

To avoid the risks of greenwashing, the European Commission drafted on 28 November 2020 a taxonomy to classify, among the industries responsible for more than 80% of greenhouse gases, economic activities according to their ecological impact and to direct investments towards projects that it recognises as "sustainable" through the recognition of a "green label". While the classification of energy activities introduces an across-the-board limit of 100 grams of CO_{2} emissions per kilowatt-hour (100g CO_{2}e / kWh), the separate classification of energy sources deserving of the green label and therefore of being financed by the NGEU is the subject of heated debate. Opposition, in particular, comes from promoters of natural gas as a "transitional energy", who fear gas being denied a green label, due to its emission level exceeding the across-the-board limit, especially in Germany and the Eastern European states where natural gas represents a significant part of the electric-generation mix. Defenders of the taxonomy include promoters of nuclear energy, whose inclusion in the taxonomy is defended by France and Czechia. These tensions have led the commission to postpone publication of the taxonomy, fearing that it will be rejected by a qualified majority vote in the Council and the Parliament.

== Distribution ==
NGEU grants are distributed based on a formula using GDP per capita, unemployment rate in 2015–2019, GDP growth in 2020 its changes during pandemics in 2020 and 2021. The allocation benefits the southern countries of the EU, with Italy and Spain receiving the largest sums, Greece getting the most money per capita, while disfavoring, for example, Hungary and Poland. As of 2025, the "PIGS" (Portugal, Italy, Greece, and Spain) got 78% of the funds while contributing only 28% of the GDP.

== National economies and recovery and resilience plans ==
With the departure of the UK, there was the hope of phasing out national rebates in the EU. But instead of this, the budget deal provides NGEU-skeptical Germany and the so-called Frugal Four — Denmark, the Netherlands, Austria, and Sweden — with even larger rebates, in total €53.2 billion for the 2021–2027 budget period, financed by all member states according to their gross national incomes (GNI). Germany and France support grants and loans as financial instruments to strengthen European economies during the COVID-19 crisis in 2020 in their joint position papers. Germany and France wanted to show leadership and pave the way for unity in the EU.

Until the economic crisis following the COVID-19 pandemic, Germany was the strongest advocate for fiscal restraint and austerity in times of crisis. However, with the emergence of the COVID-19 crisis, it has changed this position by supporting a grant instrument and large-scale common EU debt issuance.

The Frugal Four — Denmark, the Netherlands, Sweden, and Austria — have coordinated their positions due to the high stakes. Thus, they were also mostly in favor of supporting common debt issuance and loans in the NGEU.

Southern European countries, especially Italy and Spain, wanted grants to be allocated with as little conditionality as possible. They had high backlogs before the COVID-19 outbreak and already had high budget deficits. Following the impact of the 2008 financial crisis on economies and welfare states, trust in the EU has declined. Although the leaders of Italy and Spain met shortly before the July 2020 European Summit, they did not formally coordinate their positions with the NGEU.

With regard to the Eastern European countries, Poland and Hungary argued for a strong link between the NGEU and the MFF, as they were net beneficiaries. This position was supported by other Visegrad countries: Czechia, and Slovakia, and the Friends of Cohesion. Therefore, these entities insisted that the NGEU should be temporary and the MFF should be the main vehicle targeting underdeveloped regions.

The European Union has taken strong action to assure recovery through Next Generation EU, a €750 billion plan composed of grants and loans. Nonetheless, the COVID-19 recovery is expected to dominate global public finances in the near term, heeding demands from various stakeholders to ensure that short-term expenditure in support of recovery is consistent with long-term goals.

=== Germany ===
==== Economic effects ====
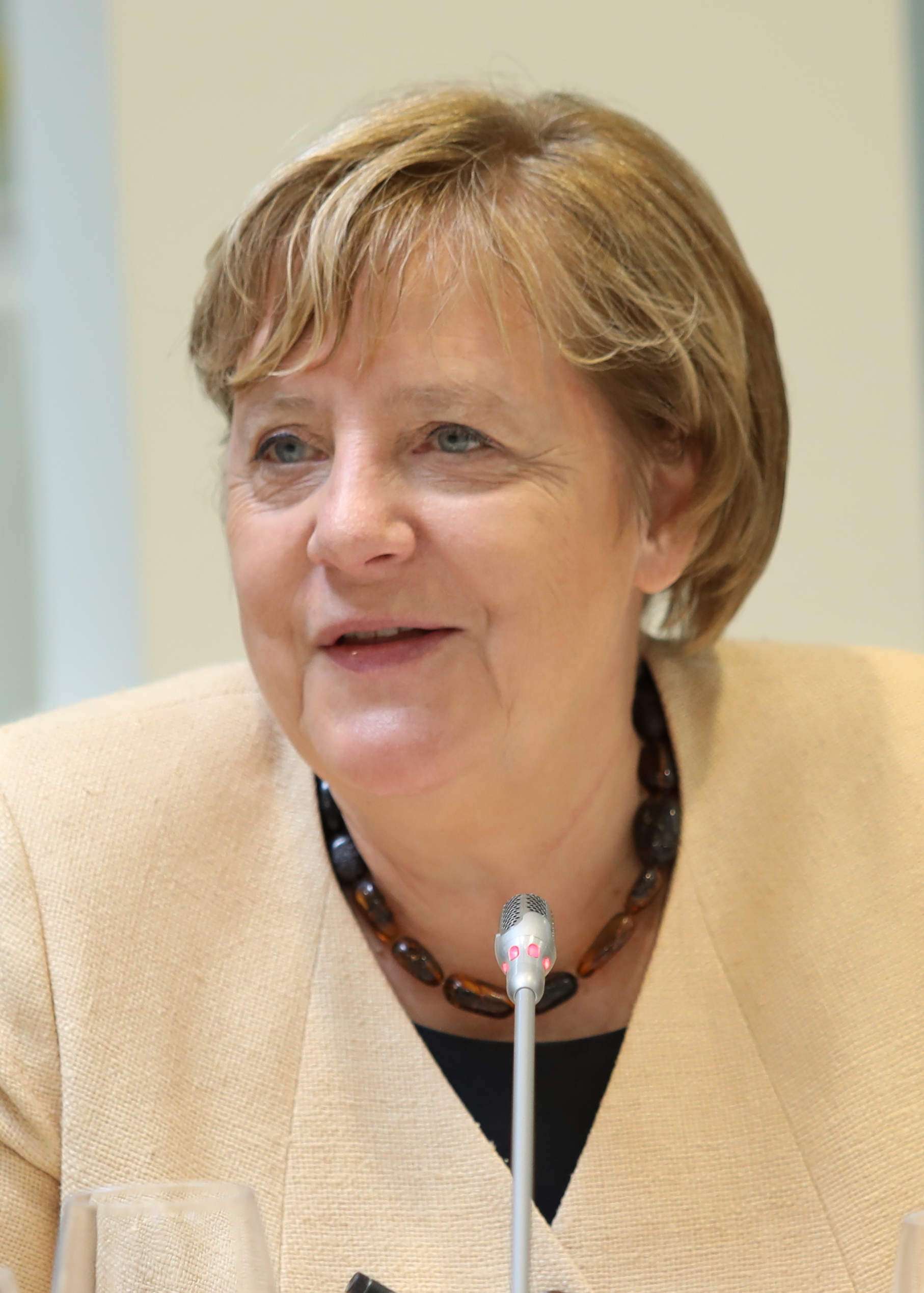
Chancellor Angela Merkel was a major contributor in the approval of the Next Generation EU.

The pandemic has had a major impact on Germany's economic growth. The measures taken to contain the pandemic affected the provision of services and the production of goods. In 2020, the economy was affected by a severe recession, the beginning of the pandemic having led to a decline in price-adjusted GDP of 5.0% at the end of the year. Economic output fell, even collapsed in practically all areas, except for the construction sector. Nevertheless, expansionary, monetary, and fiscal policy measures were put in place, with a 130 billion economic plan to support the economy. With this program, the country aims to prevent bankruptcies, mass layoffs and increased poverty. The situation is still critical, but citizens' expectations are gradually improving.

The state wanted to fight the impact of the health crisis by creating measures to preserve the supply of health care, support small businesses and the self-employed, put in place measures to boost the real economy, and give financial aid to strengthen companies' liquidity. Recently, the government has extended this program until December 2021. However, the German economy by itself cannot absorb all of the negative effects of the pandemic. Indeed, the country needs stronger stabilization measures.

The German government's attitude toward the recovery plan was perplexing. Chancellor Angela Merkel has refused to pay to help other European countries in crisis but changed her mind during the spring of 2020 and has agreed that more than €300 billion of subsidies will be distributed to those most affected by the health crisis. Nevertheless, the Constitutional Court has suspended the ratification process of the European recovery fund because of an appeal against the mechanism used, based on the plan's involving a common European debt. In April 2021, the Recovery Plan is still not implemented because of a complaint filed with the German Constitutional Court. The debate between Germany and the European Recovery Plan is still ongoing.

==== Governmental priorities ====
The government wanted to act very quickly to counter the economic impact of the health crisis. Indeed, the partial unemployment measures have been taken over by the state by paying employees 60% of their salary, which means €550 billion granted to companies, a sum increased on 1 April to €1,200 billion. To do this, Germany relied on its very healthy finances, on a budget surplus of almost €50 billion before the health crisis, and a public debt reduced to 60% of GDP.

Strong fiscal measures are also a German priority. This has strengthened the capacity of the health care system and protected jobs and businesses. Guarantees have been provided and capital injections made by the authorities to preserve liquidity and solvency. In addition, accelerating digital transformation through improved digital public services and infrastructure deployment would reduce the cost of future containment.

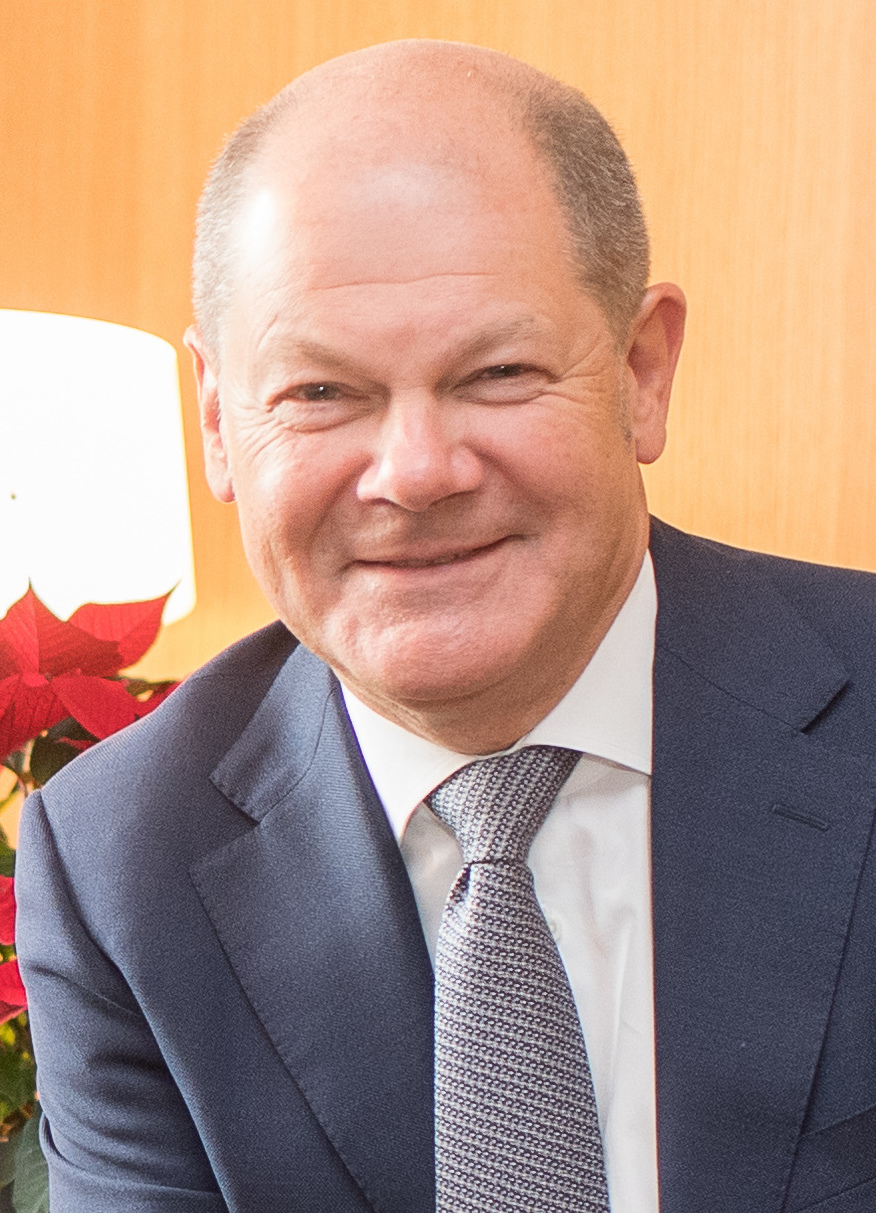
Social-democratic finance minister of Germany Olaf Scholz has supported the recovery plan since the beginnings.

Germany wants to lessen the economic consequences, with aid being focused on the following areas: health and protective equipment measures, cash payments for the self-employed and small businesses, increased social benefits, provision of guarantees, tax revenue reductions, and tax deferrals. In addition to the federal government's expenditures, the employment agency is using the reserves it has built up to cover expenditures for the short-time work scheme.

Apart from the economic aspect, health priorities are also important. The German government wants to ensure the provision of health care in times of crisis. Sanitary measures are still in effect and the vaccination campaign is progressing. It is important to keep in mind that the government has made it clear that it will spend as much as necessary to combat the crisis while ensuring that temporary measures, such as the extension of the short-time working scheme and liquidity support, have a clear end date, to facilitate the transition to a more sustainable fiscal situation during the recovery.

Moreover, the priority for Germany is to support this Recovery Plan, which would allow Europe to recover. Indeed, the control of the crisis linked to COVID-19 and the economic recovery are part of the German federal government's program. During Germany's presidency of the Council of the EU, the country has stated that it wants to conclude negotiations on a European climate law with the goal of climate neutrality by 2050, to implement the EU's Healthy Nature Strategy, and to use digital technology for environmental protection and innovation, which are the priorities of the Recovery Plan. Germany expects the heads of states and governments to agree on the recovery fund and the multi-annual financial framework, which includes a commitment to the principle of the rule of law and a mechanism to protect the budget.

==== Resource allocation ====
This Recovery Plan will enable Germany to achieve a short-term economic growth (around €78 billion), to invest in green and future technologies (also around €78 billion), and to have European and international solidarity (€3 billion in addition to the efforts provided for in the European Commission's recovery plan). Furthermore, the Next Generation instrument would help member states absorb shocks by providing the weaker economies with grants.

In this context, Germany has shown the way to recovery by focusing on economic and environmental concerns. Indeed, its Recovery Plan is not just about boosting the economy, but about creating a more sustainable future economy. Germany's actions can give impetus to the European Commission's recently proposed €750 billion European Recovery Plan, as well as to the Green Deal that frames the EU's transition to a low-carbon economy. At the heart of its measures are numerous investments, including €50 billion, aimed at reducing the carbon footprint but also promoting development in low-carbon industries.

In addition, Germany is planning €2 billion to fund efficient hydrogen projects. This would support the transition away from coal, with funds for industrial-scale projects and energy supply. A further €2 billion will go to energy-efficient building retrofits providing employment and environmental benefits. The rest of the package will focus on consumption, support for companies hit hard by the COVID-19 crisis, health, artificial intelligence research, public spending, and support for international partners, especially within the European Union. The importance of development and humanitarian aid is also emphasized by the German government. Germany remains the economic and political heavyweight of Europe. Its wealth is accompanied by enormous influence, which is reinforced by the country's six-month presidency of the European Union in the second half of 2020 and its active role in the Recovery Plan.

Furthermore, Germany's Recovery and Resilience Plan provides a total of €27.9 billion. "The maximum financial contribution in grants available to Germany under the Regulation amounts to €25.6 billion. As the estimated cost of the German plan is higher than Germany's allocation, any additional amount will be covered by Germany”.

=== France ===
==== Economic effects ====
COVID-19 reached France on 24 January 2020 with its first victim, in Bordeaux, who had travelled through Wuhan. 28 January 2020 marked the first death caused by COVID-19 outside of Asia. On 12 March 2020, President Emmanuel Macron announced that all schools and universities across the country would be closed. On 13 March 2020, Prime Minister Édouard Philippe announced that all bars, restaurants, cinemas, and nightclubs would be closed. On 16 March 2020, Macron announced that a national lockdown would begin on 17 March 2020. The lockdown was initially to last for 15 days, but was extended to 30 days, and then, on 13 April 2020, Macron announced that the lockdown would last until 11 May 2020. The lockdown was progressively lifted starting from 11 May 2020, as daily cases had been dropping by 100 per day. Bars and restaurants were allowed to reopen in Paris on 14 June 2020, followed by schools, cinemas, gyms, and other establishments on 22 June 2020, while the borders with non-EU countries were reopened on 1 July 2020. On 28 October 2020, Macron announced that France would enact a second national lockdown from 30 October 2020 that would last until 1 December 2020 at least. On 31 March 2021, Macron announced that France would enact a third national lockdown that would begin on 3 April 2021 and would last for at least a month.

The National Institute of Statistics and Economic Studies (Institut national de la statistique et des études économiques, or INSEE) reports that France suffered its worst recession since the Second World War as a result of the COVID-19 pandemic. GDP shrank by 8.3% following three lockdowns. Household consumption also fell 7.1%. INSEE had predicted an even more severe impact of 9% loss of GDP, but the French economy withstood the shock. Consumption has also declined 5.4% as a result of lockdowns. Investment declined by 9.8% as a result of falls in exports of 16.7% and in imports of 11.6%. INSEE reports that unemployment in France rose from 7.1% in 2018 to 9.0% in 2020.

==== Governmental priorities ====
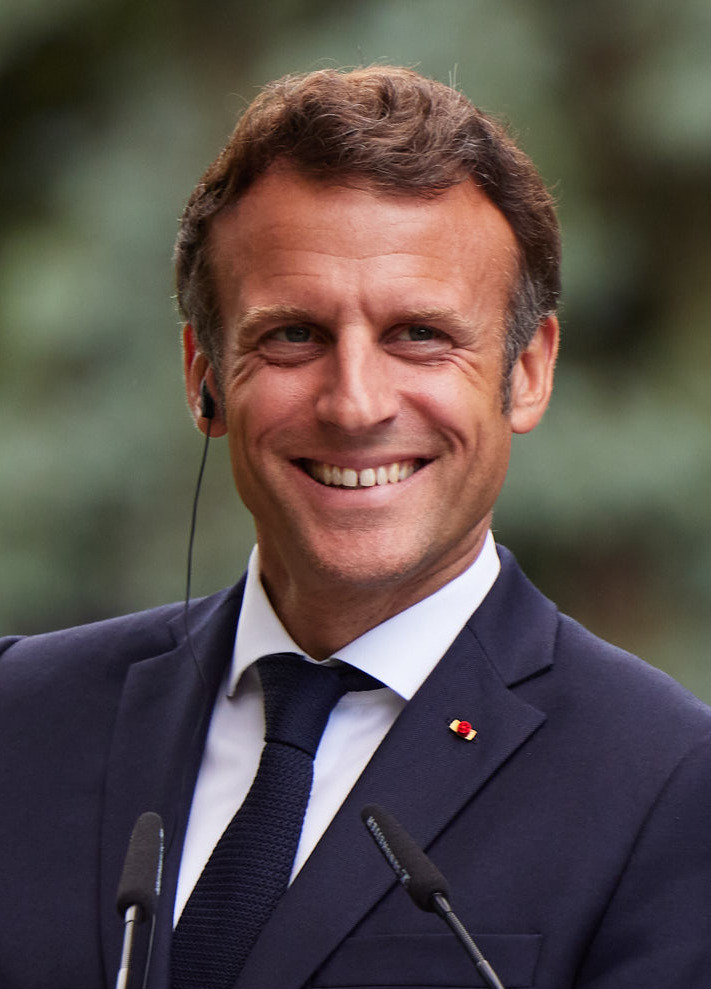
French President Emmanuel Macron was a strong supporter of the recovery plan.

France Relance, presented by the government on 3 September 2020, refers to the plan to build the France of 2030 by transforming the economy through a focus on three areas: competitiveness, cohesion, and ecology. The plan entails the investment of €100 billion into the relevant sectors.

France Relance will allocate €34 billion to ensuring competitiveness. By upgrading national production; investing in new technologies, reducing taxes on production; and increasing support for research, training, and development, France strives to regain economic sovereignty both for France and Europe. France will target five sectors for investments: health, inputs for production, electronics, agrifoods, and industrial 5G. France moreover strives to reduce its carbon footprint by reversing the process of outsourcing back to France by investing into new technologies under the Investments for the Future Programme (le Programme d’Investissements d’avenir, or PIA) to promote innovation in digitalisation, medical and health research, zero carbon energy, sustainable agriculture, transport, and mobility. The government strives to increase France's appeal for research and entrepreneurship by lowering taxes on production by €10 billion a year from 1 January 2021. Taxes on production in France account for 3.2% of GDP in 2018 compared to an average of 1.6% across the European Union.

France Relance will allocate €36 billion to ensuring cohesion. France will focus on investing in decreasing inequalities by supporting young and vulnerable people who seek employment. France will also respond to the need for acquiring new skills by the workforce as a result of the ecological transition, circular economy, and digital technology, by increasing the availability of vocational training by about 400,000 people and by transforming the training systems. Investments in vocational training will also be aimed towards strategic sectors, through the allocation of €1.6 billion for increasing the number of certificate-based training programs.

France Relance will allocate €30 billion to ensuring a healthy ecology. The ambition of France consists in becoming the first major economy in Europe to achieve carbon neutrality by 2050. France will support projects across the country intending to encourage the industrial use of hydrogen by creating the Important Project of Common European Interest (IPCEI). France will also allocate €1.2 billion to encourage the use of bicycles and public transport and to improve the quality of existing services. France will also improve the quality of its rail network to increase the availability of trains in the less-densely-populated areas and to link urban areas with rural ones, thus speeding up professional mobility, improving the overall experience, especially for people facing reduced mobility, and developing the transport of goods to cooperate hand-in-hand with businesses, logistics, and ports in a sustainable economy. France will also strive to satisfy the demand for local agriculture and increase food self-reliance by shifting its agricultural model towards more resilient solutions.

==== Resource allocation ====
France Relance will require that €100 billion. €40 billion will come from the Next Generation EU, as France has requested €40.9 billion in grants under the Recovery and Resistance Facility. 50% of the budget will be allocated to the ecological transition with the objective of reducing greenhouse gas emissions by 55%, compared to 1990, by 2030. MaPrimeRénov', an initiative introduced under France Relance, will contribute to the transition by renovating homes to incorporate the sustainable use of energy. 230,000 applications have been submitted as of May 2021. The European Commission has, however, set a couple of criteria for eligibility: 37% of the budget must be devoted to environmental objectives of the EU, in particular carbon neutrality by 2050, and 20% must be devoted to economic digitalization.

France will be the third-largest beneficiary of the funds under Next Generation EU, amounting to 11.7% of all subsidies. France's allocation of up to €40 billion under Next Generation EU will go along with almost €3 billion under React-EU. France, however, will not receive loans, only grants. The French plan, in line with the priorities set by the European Commission, will pursue three strategic objectives: competitiveness, cohesion, and ecology. Each objective will be allocated 35% of the 100 billion under France Relance, with 40 billion coming directly from the Next Generation EU.

France Relance is divided into 25 components and 68 measures based on the three objectives defined by the European Commission. 12 sub-areas have been defined for clarity: tax reduction on production (20%), employment and training (14%), future investment programme (11%), transport (11%), energy transition by business (9%), investment in hospitals and research (9%), energy-conservation renovation of buildings (7%), other aids (7%), local communities (5%), business support (3%), improving soil quality and biodiversity (3%), industrial development (1%).

=== Italy ===
==== Economic effect ====
At the beginning of the crisis, the government decided to implement a nationwide lockdown, to safeguard the health of its citizens. Those conditions had a devastating effect on the already fragile Italian economy. Since the beginning of the crisis, the country has entered a deep economic recession, losing 9% of its GDP in 2020, equal to a loss of €156 billion. The crisis affected all sectors of the Italian economy; industrial production and exports decreased by 9% and 17%, respectively, compared to 2019. The lockdown and the closure of borders hit the services sector hardest, such as tourism, an important source of revenue for the national economy. The national agency of tourism calculated that in 2020 foreign tourism was 49% less compared to 2019. This had an impact on related sectors, such as food services, the hotel industry, and other social economic activities. The pandemic also deeply affected the employment rate, with a loss of almost 1 million jobs in mid-2020. To respond to the economic crisis, the government adopted a different set of measures, to give assistance and liquidity to family households and enterprises hit by the crisis. The Italian public debt increased rapidly since the beginning of the epidemic. As of the beginning of 2021 it reached 160% of GDP, which is a common phenomenon across the EU, since there was an increased expenditure for healthcare and economic and social assistance. In this regard, the Italian government pushed for joint European action to tackle the COVID-19 crisis. After different proposals and strong opposition from other member states, the Italian government welcomed the commission's proposal for the Next Generation EU's plan.

==== Governmental priorities ====
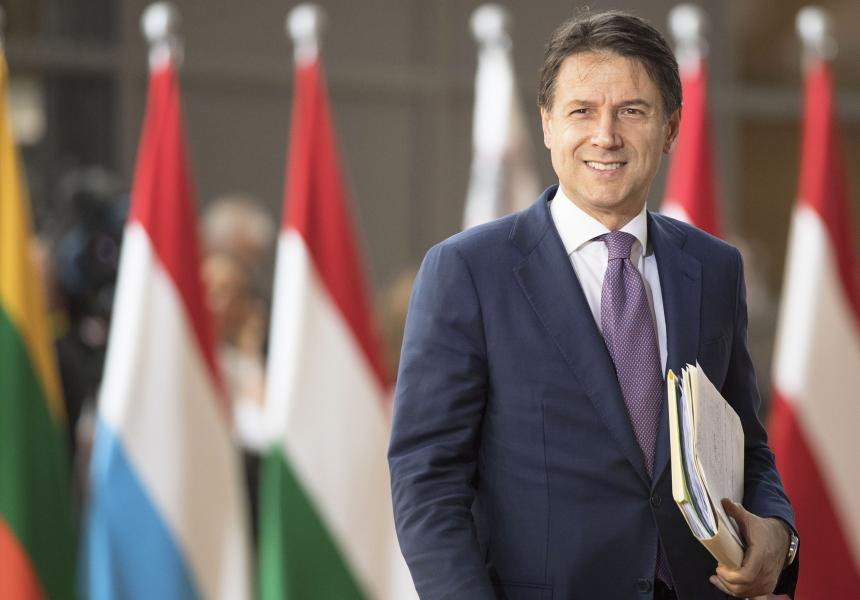
Giuseppe Conte played an important role in the implementation of the Next Generation EU.

A first draft of the Italian recovery plan was sent to the commission on 12 January 2021, by the previous government in power, led by Giuseppe Conte. However, the proposal faced skepticism within the government coalition and caused, among other things, the collapse of the government. Consequently, as of 13 February 2021, Mario Draghi became the new prime minister of Italy, and, at his installation in power, he made it clear that the national recovery plan was his number one priority. The final version of the document, called the National Recovery and Resilience Plan (PNRR), was sent to the commission on 30 April 2021, respecting the deadline imposed by Brussel, with significant differences from the old document.

Italy is the biggest beneficiary, by absolute value, of the NGEU funds. The total amount of resources in the PNRR is €235.1 billion, the RRF funds destined for Italy are €191.5 billion in total: €68.9 billion allocated through grants and €122.6 billion in loans, to be spent within the 2021–2023 period, with an additional €13 billion from the REACT-EU fund. The Italian government has also allocated €30.6 billion, through a complementary fund, financed by its national budget. The national plan is coherent with the structure foreseen by the NGEU agreement, using 38% of the funds for "green transition" projects, and 25% for "digitalization" projects. The PNRR is based on three main priorities, which are gender inclusion, the education, training, and employment of youth in line with the European Flagships projects for sustainable growth, and territorial cohesion with 40% of the resources destined to the mezzogiorno. the national plan foresees 6 missions:

- Digitalization, Innovation, Competitiveness, and Culture
- Green revolution and Ecological transition
- Infrastructure for sustainable mobility
- Education and Research
- Inclusion and Cohesion
- Health

In parallel with those missions the government will also implement different structural reforms, acting on the commission's recommendations. The government will apply 2 horizontal reforms, to the public administration and to the judicial system, consisting of structural innovations of those sectors, to improve the efficiency, equity, and competitiveness of the country. It will also adopt enabling reforms, in order to simplify and rationalize national legislation, by removing administrative, legal, and procedural obstacles that negatively influence the quality of public services offered to its citizens and businesses. Finally, the government will implement support reforms, to alleviate the socio-economic impact of the COVID-19 crisis. Those reforms will impact and increase social equity and the competitiveness of the production system and will be adopted throughout the implementing period of the PNRR.

==== Resource allocation ====
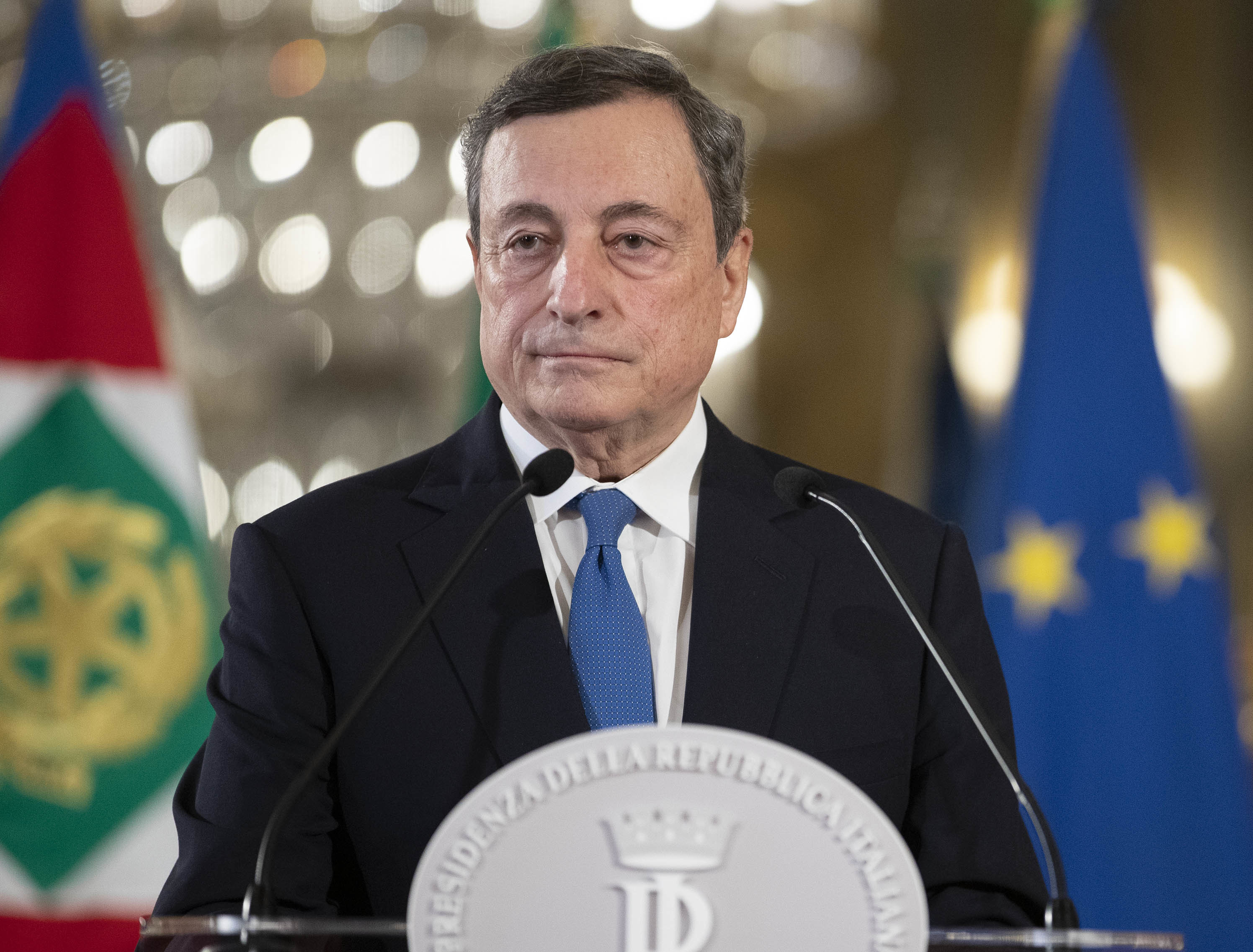
Mario Draghi's government wrote the Next Generation EU's plan for Italy.

The PNRR allocates its resources to 16 specific components grouped in 6 missions, with the aim of implementing investments, projects, and structural reforms to achieve the objectives foreseen by the NGEU agreement. The government decided to use all the possible resources of the RFF, equivalent to 191.5 billion, already allocating to the PNRR the first 70% of the grants given to the country, which must be spent between during the 2020–23 period. Those missions will be financially complemented by the REACT-EU funds destined for Italy, which amount to €13 billion, and by a complementary fund (C.F.) of €30 billion financed by the country's national budget.

A. MISSION 1: Digitalization, Innovation, Competitiveness, Culture (40.73 RRF / 0.80 REACT-EU / C.F. 8.54) = €50.07 billion

The first mission aims at increasing the competitiveness, productivity, and digitalization of the Italian economy and public sector, to have a positive impact on private investments, and to give a more efficient public service to its citizens and businesses. It divides its resources into three components:

- The first component allocates 9.75 RFF / €1.20 C.F. billion, in order to digitalize, innovate, and securitize the public administration, with the objective to make the public administration more accessible while offering more efficient services. Different projects are foreseen to develop digital infrastructure, pushing the administration to use digitized data and to upload them in the "cloud" and strengthening cybersecurity defense systems.
- The second component allocates 24.30 RFF / 0.80 REACT-EU / 5.88 C.F. billion, to promote innovation and digitalization in production. It will act in different economic sector and incentives investment in technology and R&D. This component also foresees strategic assistance to the digitalization and innovation of S&MEs, to support the internationalization processes and the competitiveness of industrial supply chains.
- The third component allocates 6.68 RFF / 1.46 C.F. billion to boost the tourism and culture sectors, hard-hit by the crisis, and with emphasis on the national economy.

B. MISSION 2: Green revolution and ecological transition (59.33 RFF / 1.31 REACT-EU / 9.32 C.F.) = €69.96 billion

The government took the PNRR as a chance to allocate a consistent amount of money to foster development and investment for ecological transition to meet the sustainable developments goals and European Green Deal goals by 2030, and to reach net neutrality by 2050. This mission has 4 components:

- The first component allocates 5.27 RFF / 0.50 REACT-EU / 1.20 C.F. billion to increase sustainability, on the one hand, by modernizing and developing new waste treatment plants and fill the infrastructural gap in the south of Italy, to realize the flagship project for circular economy; and, on the other hand, to develop a smart and sustainable agricultural supply chain.
- The second component allocates 23.78 RFF / 0.18 REACT-EU /1.40 C.F. billion, to develop industrial know-how in the transition sector, to be more competitive at the European and international level, with the aim of reducing dependence on external innovative technology (sustainable transport, batteries for the electric transport sector, etc.).
- The third component allocate 15.22 RFF / 0.32 REACT-EU / 6.72 C.F. billion to increase the energy efficiency of public and private buildings. The funds will be directly issued to citizens through allowances.
- The last component, with 15.06 RFF / 0.31 REACT-EU billion, put in place different projects and actions that will make the country more resilient against climate change, protect biodiversity, and assure the security and efficiency of the water system.

C. MISSION 3: Infrastructure for sustainable mobility (25,13RFF /0.00 REACT-EU / 6.33 C.F.) = €31.46 billion

The third mission aims at creating, by 2026, a more modern and sustainable transport infrastructure system, and reducing the infrastructure gap between the south and north of Italy, which represents an impediment for economic convergence in the country. This mission foresees 2 components:

- The first component allocates 24.77 RFF / 3.20 C.F. billion to modernize and develop the railway system, and to boost the train infrastructure in the south of Italy in order to increase the connectivity between regions.
- The second component, with 0.36 RFF / 3.13 C.F. billion, will be used for air transport.

D. MISSION 4: Education and Research (30.88 RFF / 1.93 REACT-EU / 1.00 C.F.) = €33.81 billion

The fourth mission aims at improving the national education system, by investing and increasing the efficiency and quality of the education structure. The aim is also the reduce the school dropout rate and to increase the number of workers with a tertiary diploma. This mission foresees 2 components:

- The first component, with 19.44 RFF /1.45 REACT-EU billion, aims at increasing the educational offerings, from kindergarten to university.
- The second component, with 11.44 / 0.48 REACT-EU / 1 C.F. billion, aims at increasing investment in R&D, favoring the transition towards a know-how-based economy.

E. MISSION 5: Inclusion and Cohesion (19.81 RFF / 7.25 REACT-EU / 2.55 C.F.) = €29.62 billion

The fifth mission has the objective to fulfill the priorities of the PNRR, by increasing investment to fight gender discrimination, increase the inclusion of youth in the job market, and to rebalance territorial disparities in the Mezzogiorno. This mission foresees 3 components that answer to the commission's recommendation and will be complemented by different structural reforms:

- The first component allocates 6.66 RFF / 5.97 REACT-EU billion to implement reforms with the aim of transforming the job market, by creating different instruments that would facilitate the job transition, protection of workers, and increase the employment rate.
- The second component issues 11.17 RFF / 1.28 REACT-EU / 0.13 C.F. billion for social cohesion and inclusion.
- The third component will employ 1.98 RFF / 2.43 C.F. billion for territorial cohesion, aiming at strengthening the economic competitiveness of the Mezzogiorno regions.

F. MISSION 6: Health. (15.63 RFF / 1.71 REACT-EU / 2.89 C.F.) = €20.22 billion

The resources of the sixth and final mission will be invested to strengthen the resilience of the national healthcare system, which was weakened by the pandemic.

The PNRR foresee the participation of multiple actors at the domestic level. The fulfillment of the structural reforms will be completed by the specific competent ministries and administrations. However, regarding the engagement of specific interventions and projects, the central administrations, the regional and local entities will be responsible to coordinate and implement them. In addition, the government arranged a governance scheme which provides a structure for coordinating and monitoring the national recovery and resilience plan. This structure will be set up within the Ministry of Economy and Finance, it will also be the point of contact for the European Commission.

==== Controversy ====
In April 2024, Italian investigators announced that they had uncovered an international fraud scheme involving €600 million related to the recovery fund. According to police, the fraud, which was carried out by criminal associates in Romania, Italy, Slovakia, and Austria, involved "refined money-laundering apparatus…using advanced technologies such as cloud servers located in uncooperative countries, cryptoassets, and artificial intelligence to produce false documents." In its 2023 annual report, the European Public Prosecutor’s Office said that there are currently 179 open investigations in Italy related its use of recovery funds.

=== Denmark ===
==== Economic effects ====
Denmark is a member state of the European Union and has a welfare system that provides public services to its population. The government and other community organizations perform regulatory functions and contribute to the provision of public services.

Before COVID-19, the Danish economy had a solid industrial and trade base, lacking significant macroeconomic inequalities. As a result of the COVID-19 crisis that broke out in Europe in general, and Denmark in particular, the positive trends of economic development came to an unpredictable halt in early March 2020, causing a financial crisis that needed a rapid response. Due to the measures taken by the Danish government in a timely manner to curb the spread of the epidemic, the economy experienced a sudden slowdown followed by a decline.

Denmark was one of the first states in Europe to act decisively against COVID-19 by declaring a national lockdown and closing its national borders. In the first half of 2020, the Danish economy was badly affected. As a small country with an open economy and a structural balance of payments surplus, Denmark's economy is heavily dependent on foreign trade. As such, the country recorded its deepest fall in GDP in the first half of 2020 (−7.7% per year in Q2 alone) due to the COVID-19 crisis. Since the initial spread of the coronavirus in Denmark was essentially under control, the Danish economy could withstand the worldwide crisis caused by COVID-19 relatively firmly.

==== Governmental priorities ====
The Danish government's priorities and resilience plan includes improving energy efficiency, promoting renewable energies, strengthening sectoral integration through electrification, transforming the transport sector for more sustainable mobility, and the transition to a circular economy. However, the Danish article further emphasizes the importance of Europe's digital transformation and the EU's need to be more self-sufficient in terms of "certain technologies critical to future economic development and security in Europe", especially 5G.

A. Scale and accelerate investments in the "green transition", including:

1. Expansion of renewable energy infrastructure to ensure the free flow of renewable energy throughout the EU and to facilitate the rapid deployment of renewable energy.
2. Promote renewable energy generation, especially offshore hybrid projects, through EU regulation and mobilized financing.
3. Increase industry integration, especially through increased electrification.
4. Improve energy efficiency in buildings to promote job creation and reduce emissions.
5. Greening the transport industry, including light and heavy-duty vehicles and transport.
6. The transition to a circular economy, the promotion of the best available clean technologies, water efficiency, and bio-based and nature-based solutions.
7. Promote the best available clean technologies (water, resources, air, chemicals).
8. Biological and nature-based solutions, including a focus on the food industry.

B. Develop new technology facilitators and update the regulatory framework to make Europe a digital pioneer, make the Single Market work for business, with 5G, artificial intelligence, and quantum communications, at an accelerated rate. Expansion and electrification of the European energy system supporting the climate-neutral target.

C. Promote industrial ecosystems crucial to Europe's crisis resilience and green and digital transition. This will include further development of:

1. A life sciences industry that provides Europe's innovative capacity to maintain and develop essential medicines and medical equipment.
2. Develop hydrogen and X-power supply centers and green industrial ecosystems around these centers. Power-to-X can help de-carbonize the industry and contribute to sustainable transport solutions such as zero-emission shipping. In combination with Carbon Capture, Use and Storage (CCUS), "hard to eliminate" emissions from the largest CO_{2} emitters can be significantly reduced.
3. New technology, such as research and innovation in artificial intelligence and quantum technology and communications, increases Europe's digital capacity.

==== Resource allocation ====
To prevail in this crisis, the Danish government has applied its own plans and the plans that have been adopted by the EU. Under NGEU, the Danish government will receive grants and loans to address the impact of the COVID-19 pandemic on the national economy. With Recovery and Resilience Facility (maximum grant allocations), Denmark will be allocated €1.6 billion. Alongside the Recovery and Resilience Facility, Denmark will receive 178 million EUR under REACT-EU for 2021. It will be also be allocated €46 million under the Just Transition Fund and €54.3 million, for 2021 and 2022, under the European Agricultural Fund for Rural Development.

Denmark is a special case due to its opt-out from the Eurozone. The Krone is Danish currency in which the EU grants and loans are received. The Krone is part of the European Exchange Rate Mechanism (ERM) II.

=== Belgium ===
==== Economic effects ====
With a small open economy, Belgium, as well as many other countries, will not be able to escape the consequences of the pandemic. Belgium is one of the counties hit hardest economically by the second wave of the pandemic, which can be explained by the duration of the confinement and the drastic measures taken to fight the virus. The impact on the economy proved to be much greater than initially thought. Nearly 40% of Belgian household spending is influenced by COVID-19 restrictions and 70% of GDP will be impacted by this lockdown. The Belgian economy is highly integrated with global supply chains that have been disrupted by the coronavirus; specifically, the strong ties with Germany pose a significant risk in this regard. Having the second largest port in Europe and many logistic and international companies active in that area, makes the Belgian economy very sensitive to an economic "slow down" elsewhere. Considering Belgium's position as a trade center, imports are expected to develop in line with exports, ensuring a contraction in 2020 and a rebound in 2021. Moreover, unemployment will be a huge issue in all areas, specifically in sectors such as tourism, leisure, hotels, restaurants, and the arts, where the likelihood of bankruptcies will be much higher. The positive effects for the economy will be delayed due to the fact that the de-confinement is expected to be more gradual.

==== Governmental priorities ====
The Belgian government's strategy in response to the COVID-19 outbreak is, first of all, to protect public health. At this point, diverse health-related measures have been introduced. Nevertheless, health-related measures have also significantly impacted socio-economics. Consequently, measures have been taken on both health-related and socio-economic levels. To protect public health, safety measures have been taken in the forms of confinement and curfew, limiting the movement of persons to a minimum. In regards to the socio-economic impact of the virus, measures to support the health care system, companies, and self-employed households have been introduced in the form of deferral of payments of federal taxes, loans, and invocation of temporary unemployment.

The government is taking measures to fight the impact that coronavirus had on society; but the COVID-19 pandemic has led to a global health crisis. In consequence, the Belgian economy will have to endure multiple shocks. At this point, different levels of government have been taking measures to alleviate the socio-economic effects of the pandemic. With regard to the EU recovery plan, following the recommendations of The European Semester, Belgium will improve measures to address the crisis and support recovery. Strengthening the resilience and healthcare system will be prioritized, as well as mitigating unemployment and ensuring effective implementation of measures supporting the liquidity of firms and businesses. Furthermore, the focus will be on investment in green and digital transition, in addition to research and innovation. Such areas as sustainable transport, more energy-efficient buildings, digital infrastructure will benefit from the investments.

==== Resource allocation ====
The federal government and the governments of the federal entities that make up Belgium have reached an agreement on a first draft of a Plan for Recovery and Resilience and on the distribution of funds. Belgium will benefit from billions of euros in grants and loans, which is considered an important step in the Belgian economic recovery strategy. At times when the economy of the country is hit particularly hard, the Recovery and Resilience investment plan is meant to help renew the economy and make it stronger.

The Next Generation recovery plan is supported by such political actors as the federal prime minister Alexander De Croo, who confirmed that the projects funded by the program are ready to start. In the interim, at the federal level, Secretary of State Thomas Dermine will be responsible for communication between beneficiaries of the funds. However, the Flemish prime minister Jan Jambon admits that, while receiving funds would be beneficial, it wasn't easy to negotiate with other governments. He comments that it is important to find an agreement where everyone benefits from the plan and calls it "defensible".

After reaching an agreement on the first draft of a Recovery and Resilience Plan and on the distribution of funds, Belgium can benefit from approximately €5 billion in grants and loans. Furthermore, on 11 January 2021 Belgian authorities reached an agreement on how the funds will be allocated between local governments in the regions. According to the agreement, Flanders will receive the lion's share of about €2.25 billion. Wallonia in its turn will benefit from €1.48 billion, and the federal government will receive €1.25 billion. Brussels will receive €495 million, the French Community will receive €395 million, while the German Community will receive €50 million. The Flemish government founded the basis of the recovery plan for Flanders, launching a plan, called Vlaamse Veerkracht (Dutch: Flemish Resilience), that includes innovations in digital transformation and the transition of Flanders to a more sustainable economy. Wallonia in its turn has launched a similar program called "Get Up Wallonia" which sees as a task enabling stronger economic, social, environmental, and territorial development.

The funds will be used in accordance with the recommendations given by The European Semester and will be invested in improving projects related to sustainability, green digital transition, mobility, and welfare. The funds will also help to strengthen the resilience of the health system as well as improving the business environment.

=== Spain ===
==== Economic effects ====
The disruption of the COVID-19 pandemic has severely affected the Spanish economy, as a result of the strict lockdown measures imposed by the national executive. The declaration of the State of Alarm announced by Prime Minister Pedro Sanchez on 13 March 2020 led to the nationwide closure of non-essential shops and activities. This drastic fall of the social life and economic activity determined a rapid deterioration of the main economic and financial indicators. The day previous to the announcement of the State of Alarm the Madrid stock exchange experienced its biggest collapse in history, losing 14.06% of its value.

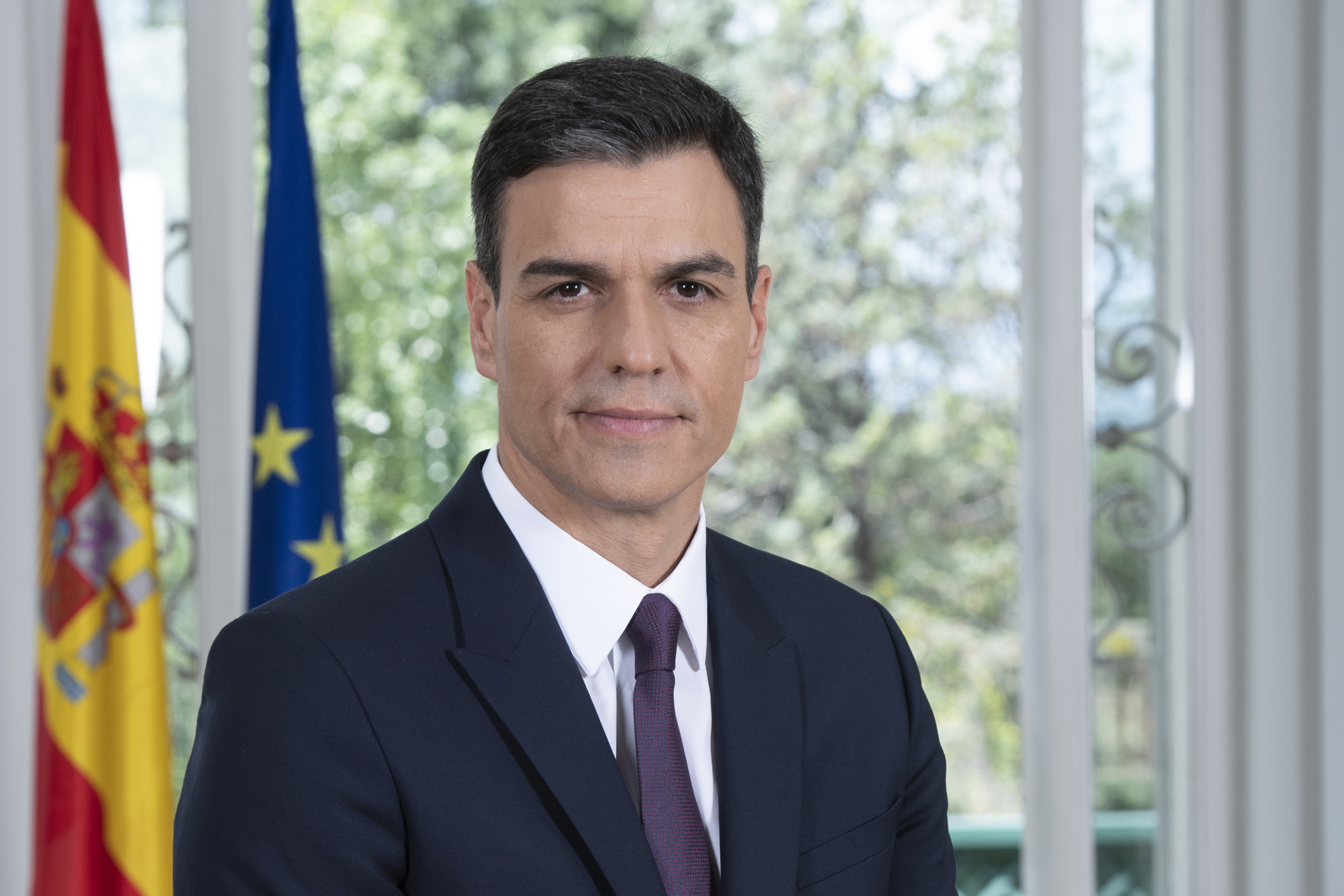
Spanish prime minister Pedro Sánchez

Compared to other countries, Spain's heavy reliance on the travel and tourism industry has deepened the economic fallout of the coronavirus crisis: the arrival of tourists in 2020 plummeted by 77% compared to the previous year, which generated €56 billion in losses for the tourism business. According to the National Statistics Institute (INE), the gross domestic product fell dramatically, by 10.8%, during 2020. In this sense, the COVID-19 recession constitutes the second deepest drop of Spanish GDP, next to the outbreak of the Spain civil war in 1936, when the economy collapsed nearly 26%. Moreover, private consumption dropped remarkably, around 12,4%, the largest setback since record-keeping started in 1970. In 2020, agriculture was the only sector to increase in terms of GDP contribution, growing 5.3% compared to 2019. On the other hand, home and infrastructure construction declined around 14.5% while service-sector and industrial production fall by 11.1% and 9.6%, respectively. The labor market has also been particularly affected: 623,000 workers lost their jobs in 2020, while almost 1 million have adhered to the temporary workforce reduction mechanism commonly known as ERTE (Expedientes de Regulación Temporal de Empleo). The unemployment rate has, therefore, reached a peak of 16,13% in the third trimester in 2020, two points higher than the year before the pandemic.

In response to the crisis, one of the earliest priorities of the Spanish government was to activate the Urgent Action Plan and the approval of a guaranteed funding of up to €100 billion. Thereafter, the Cabinet, trade unions, and employers approved the Agreement on Economic Recovery and Employment in July 2020, which laid the foundations for accelerating the recovery and the creation of quality employment. The Plan envisaged measures extending the short-time work schemes (ERTE), training of workers in the digital sphere, boosting the green transition, and implementing remote work legislation. Under this framework, a public-support programme for business solvency and investment up to €50 billion was launched. This plan consists, on the one hand, of a Solvency Support Fund, endowed with €10 billion to invest in strategic companies. On the other hand, the Official Credit Institute made available an additional investment guarantee funding for an amount of €40 billion.

==== Governmental priorities ====
The disbursement of EU funds is not automatic, but is conditioned on the elaboration of a National Recovery and Resilience Plan no later than 31 April 2021 and which has to be examined by the European Commission. As required by the European authorities, the plan should include a detailed analysis of reforms, estimated costs, and a timetable, and be aligned with European priorities. In this regard, in October 2020, the Government of Spain publicly presented the plan España Puede (Spain Can), a basic outline of the future Recovery and Resilience Plan. The final version was presented by the prime minister on 14 April 2021. During the last week of April, the Spanish government finally submitted the plan to the European Commission for its evaluation.

In absolute terms, Spain is the second largest recipient, after Italy, of European funds, getting €72 billion in the form of transfers and €68 billion in loans. Specifically, as in the rest of EU countries, these funds are channeled through two main schemes: the Recovery and Resilience Facility, providing Spain about €59 billion until 2023, and REACT-EU, for around €12 billion. Overall, under the framework of the Next Generation EU the Spanish economy ought to receive an injection of almost €155 billion and €43 billion from the 2021–2027 MFF.

The Recovery and Resilience Plan of Spain is structured around 4 guiding principles whose aim is to be the backbone of the economic policy strategy pursued by the Spanish government. The four transversal axes are closely aligned with the general objectives enshrined under the NGEU and the United Nations Sustainable Development Goals:

- ecological transition
- digitalization
- gender equality
- social and territorial cohesion

==== Resource allocation ====
In addition, the plan includes 10 policies that are crucial to foster economic recovery and employment in the first phase of the Plan, before 2023. The 10 policy priorities are composed of 30 policy components that articulate investments and reform projects seeking to modernize the country. Although most of them are horizontal in nature, some are specifically set up to boost the modernisation of key sectors, such as trade, tourism, agri-food, health, the automotive industry, and public administration.

1. Urban and rural agenda, the fight against rural depopulation and agricultural development (20.7% of the budget).
2. Resilient infrastructures and ecosystems (15.0% of the budget).
3. Energy transition (9.2% of the budget).
4. Modernisation of public administration (6.2% of the budget).
5. Modernisation and digitization of the industrial fabric and SMEs, recovery of the tourism sector, and promotion of Spain as an entrepreneurial nation (23.1% of the budget).
6. Pledge for science and innovation and strengthening the capabilities of the national health system (7.1% of the budget).
7. Education and knowledge, lifelong learning and capacity building (10.5% of the budget).
8. The new care economy and employment policies (7.0% of the budget).
9. Promotion of the culture and sports industries (1.2% of the budget).
10. Modernisation of the tax system for inclusive and sustainable growth.

Several mechanisms and institutional actors are foreseen under the Recovery and Resilience Plan of Spain with the aim to ensure optional fund management. The following structure put in place by the Spanish government intends to monitor and scrutinize the implementation and results of the Recovery and Resilience Plan:

- An Inter-ministerial Commission chaired by the prime minister.
- A Technical Committee in charge of providing technical and legal support to the Inter-ministerial Commission.
- A Recovery Fund Monitoring Unit.
- The Sectoral Conference on European Funds, jointly with the 17 autonomous communities and 2 autonomous cities led by the Minister of Finance.
- The conferences of presidents between different autonomous communities.
- A regular parliamentary scrutiny mechanism before the parliament, through the Joint Committee for European Affairs.

=== Poland ===
==== Economic effect ====
The Polish economy has been developing constantly since 1989. The current challenges, however, stem from the economic slowdown caused by the pandemic, rather than from economic weakness. Poland's economic struggle stems from three causes: the limitation of economic activity worldwide, the hit on demand-and-supply chains, and the reliance on the government to bail out all industries.

Unemployment rose from 5.1% in October 2019 to 6.1% in October 2020, meaning that currently more than 1 million people have filed for unemployment. Registered unemployment, however fails to account for professional inactivity, which would raise the unemployment rate even more, as around 3.7 million people in Poland are professionally inactive. 62% of consumers acknowledge that financial well-being has decreased, along with 70% of entrepreneurs acknowledging that income has decreased. The hospitality industry has suffered particularly as a result of lockdowns. The summer and winter holidays in Poland, for example, are relatively long (the summer season lasts between May and September and the winter season between November and March), meaning that throughout 2020 and 2021, economic activity in the hospitality industry (HoReCa) lost income altogether. The government has deployed several tools to tackle the impact of the lockdowns on economic activity: Anti-Crisis Shield 1.0, 2.0, 3.0, 4.0, 5.0, and 6.0.

Anti-Crisis Shield 1.0 was launched on 1 April 2020, allowing entrepreneurs who suffered from the economic decline to apply for benefits to protect jobs by subsidizing the salaries of employees, co-financing the salaries of employees, exempting the private businesses employing up to 9 people from paying state insurance for the period between March and May 2020, granting loans of up to €1.135 billion to entrepreneurs, and according benefits to employees who have been obliged to quarantine.

Anti-Crisis Shield 2.0 was launched on 17 April 2020 and extended the tools launched under 1.0, to include recently established enterprises that were registered between 1 February 2020 and 1 April 2020, grant exemptions from paying social security for self-employed entrepreneurs, and expand the range of businesses eligible for the exemption from paying state insurance, from 9 employees to 49 employees.

Anti-Crisis Shield 3.0 was launched on 15 May 2020 and expanded the tools launched under 2.0 by directing financial boosts to particular sectors, and introducing administrative facilitations, such as electronic correspondence.

Anti-Crisis Shield 4.0 was launched on 24 June 2020 and introduced provisions regarding the subsidies to the interest rate applicable to bank loans for ensuring financial liquidity to entrepreneurs economically hit by COVID-19 and enforced the requirement to obtain the consent of the Office of Competition and Consumer Protection to take over any company based in Poland or to acquire a considerable amount of shares or stocks, namely up to 20% of shares or stocks in a Polish company, by any entity based outside the European Union, European Economic Area, or Organisation for Economic Co-operation and Development.

Anti-Crisis Shield 5.0 was launched on 15 October 2020 and was directed towards tourism and culture, to grant benefits and exemptions from the payment of social insurance for the period between July and September 2020, following the lockdowns.

Anti-Crisis Shield 6.0 was launched on 14 December 2020, was directed towards the industries that suffered the most during the second wave of COVID-19, and was extended to additional industrial sectors, such as hospitality, transport, tourism, and entertainment.

==== Governmental priorities ====
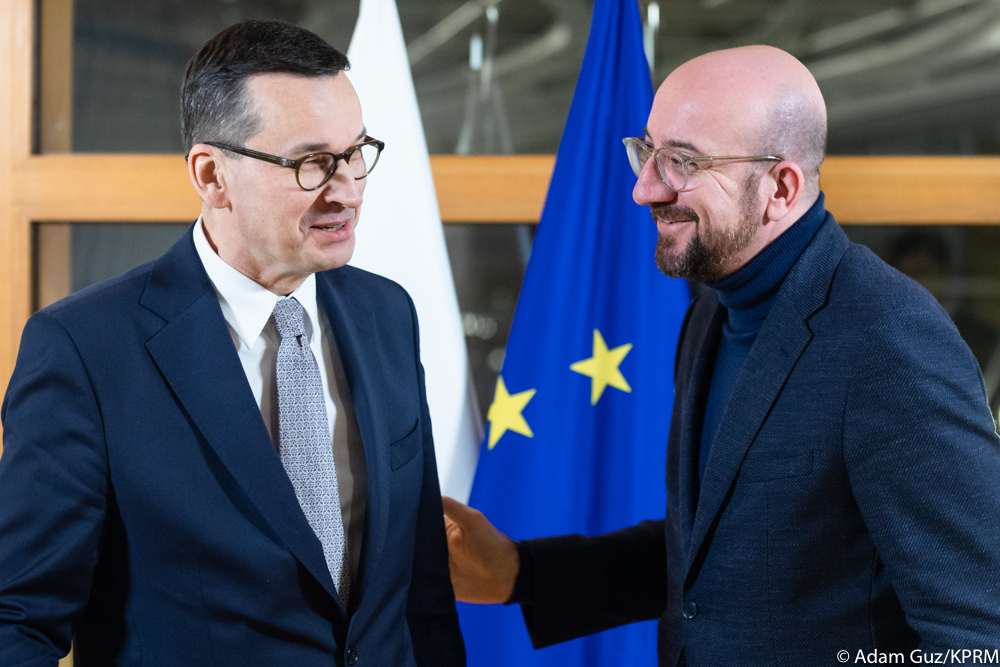
Polish prime minister Mateusz Morawiecki with European Council president Charles Michel

The first confirmed case of COVID-19 in Poland was announced on 4 March 2020. 12 people had been hospitalized under the suspicion of COVID-19, 13 had been quarantined, and 1000 were monitored by the authorities on 19 February 2020. 47 people had been Hospitalized under the suspicion of COVID-19, 55 were quarantined, and 1570 were monitored by the authorities on 27 February 2020. The World Health Organisation declared on 10 March 2020 that COVID-19 was spreading locally.

The government refused to participate in the acquisition of medical equipment led by the European Union on 28 February 2020. Łukasz Szumowski, Minister of Health, argued that Poland would ensure the acquisition of adequate tools for fighting COVID-19. The government however reiterated its commitment to the initiative on 6 March 2020.

Poland and Hungary threatened to block negotiations on the MFF and the Next Generation EU. The threat stemmed from partisan politics rather than from Next Generation EU. More than 50% of Polish citizens declared having positive feelings towards the initiative as opposed to only 16% who declared having negative feelings about the initiative.

The government rules by a coalition named Zjednoczona Prawica (United Right) composed of three political parties: Prawo i Sprawiedliwość (Law and Justice) led by Jarosław Kaczyński, Solidarna Polska (United Poland) led by Zbigniew Ziobro, and Porozumienie (Agreement) led by Jarosław Gowin. United Poland and Agreement both have enough seats to halt the parliamentary majority of the coalition.

The government is also receiving domestic pressure from a couple of sources: first, the government lost focus after handling the first wave of COVID-19 relatively well, thus failing to make adequate preparation for the second and third waves; and, second, the government filled the Constitutional Tribunal with its supporters in a series of illegal moves that have undermined the rule of law in Poland, especially the ban on abortion despite foetal defects.

Power struggles within the United Right have occurred following the decline of popular support, with Zbigniew Ziobro in particular, the leader of the United Poland and the Minister of Justice, pursuing an anti-European and anti-German narrative and orchestrating the government's assault on the judicial system.

The rule of law mechanism, which renders granting financial aid to the member states conditional on the respect of the rule of law, is the foundation of Poland's opposition to the ratification of the Next Generation EU. Jarosław Kaczyński declared that the failure to vote or abstention by United Poland would entail the end of the coalition, while Zbigniew Ziobro declared that United Poland would oppose Next Generation EU.

Germany, having the rotating presidency at the European Council, brokered a compromise: the European Commission would refrain from implementing the rule of law mechanism while a member state would challenge its legality at the Court of Justice.

Mateusz Morawiecki, the prime minister, accepted the rule of law mechanism at the European Council of July 2020 and December 2020, thus agreeing to the conditionality of the funds upon the European Commission's assessment of the member states' compliance with the rule of law. Zbigniew Ziobro insisted that the move constitutes a betrayal of the voters of the coalition.

Zjednoczona Prawica (United Right) led by Prawo i Sprawiedliwość (Law and Justice) reached an agreement with Lewica (The Left) on 27 April 2021, green lighting the ratification of the Next Generation EU. Robert Biedroń commented regarding the agreement: "One of the conditions of our support for the government is building 75,000 apartments for rent. We have also negotiated €850 million to support local Hospitals and that local governments would decide how to spend 30% of recovery fund money". €300 million would be devoted to support restaurants and hotels hit by intermittent lockdowns to tackle COVID-19 while the disbursement of the recovery funds would be supervised by a monitoring committee of government officials, trade unionists, business representatives, local governments, and NGOs.

Poland has laid out five components of the Krajowy Plan Odbudowy (National Reconstruction Plan), the Recovery and Resilience Facility, which refers to the national priorities: (1) resilience and competitiveness of the economy, (2) increase in green energy and decrease in energy consumption, (3) digital transformation, (4) effectiveness, availability, and quality of the healthcare system, (5) green and intelligent mobility.

Poland submitted the National Reconstruction Plan to the European Commission on 1 June 2021. The Law and Justice and the Left finally reached an agreement, sparking disapproval and discontent of the Civic Coalition and of All-Poland Women's Strike. The Sejm voted on the approval of the Recovery and Resilience Facility on 4 May 2021, with the outcome of 290 MPs for, 33 MPs against, and 133 MPs abstaining. The vote thus politically saved the Law and Justice Party from the implosion of the coalition government, as the majority held by only 3 seats. The United Poland party fervently opposed the Recovery and Resilience Facility "(...) arguing it would lead to the creation of a federal Europe by letting the EU take on common debt, and also links the use of the money to not violating the rule of law – a source of friction between Brussels and Warsaw". Prime Minister Mateusz Morawiecki declared following the vote: "I thank everyone who rose above partisan calculations. (...) This vote was a breakthrough. I'm taking it very positively because it turns out that there is a very big majority in our parliament which is aware that we have to work together for our country".

==== Resource allocation ====
Poland is expected to be granted €58.1 billion: €23.9 billion in grants and €34.2 billion in loans. The government will have until 2026 to allocate the money. The plans for the allocation will be laid out in the Krajowy Plan Odbudowy. The Recovery and Resilience Facility constitutes a fundamental instrument of Next Generation EU by providing €672.5 billion to boost Investments and Reforms through €312.5 billion in grants and €360 billion in loans.

Poland has submitted the Krajowy Plan Odbudowy, its Recovery and Resilience Facility, to the European Commission. Poland requests €23.9 billion in grants and €12.1 billion in loans around five pillars of resilience of the economy: (1) business environment, innovation and labor market policy, (2) green energy, (3) digital transformation, (4) sustainable transport, and (5) health system. The plan will focus on improving the quality of air, energy-efficiency in buildings, development of renewable energy, zero-emission transport, and access to broadband internet. Projects cover the Recovery and Resilience Facility until 2026.

=== Greece ===
==== Economic effect ====
Greece was hit by the pandemic but it was relatively spared from serious health consequences, compared to many other European countries. Between March 2020 and June 2020, foreign media reports had been talking a lot about this little Greek miracle, a country almost ravaged by the economic crisis for the recent years, which has been able to resist the health challenge of the coronavirus better than many other European countries. This unexpected success was mainly due to the speed of government decisions, the closing of borders, the strict confinement, but also the obedience of the population to the special rules decreed by the both health and political. However, the pandemic has caused very serious economic problems for Greece and has again plunged the country into a new recession after some signs of economic recovery that have appeared in recent years. This is mainly due to Greece's heavy reliance on tourism and the hospitality industry, which has not only weighed on the trade and current account balance, but also on employment and domestic consumption. In Greece, tourism provides an essential source of income and alone contributes almost a fifth of the GDP (the main contributing sector to the national GDP). The sector directly employs just under 400,000 people, or 10% of the country's total employment (OECD). In fact, the tourism industry has been badly affected by the COVID-19 pandemic and in 2021 it only generated half of the revenue reached in 2019. Besides the tourism sector, Greece's foreign trade has been severely affected by the pandemic, since the country has an export-oriented economy. Petroleum products represent both imported and exported items, as the country imports crude oil and exports refined products. Medicines, fish and olive oil are among the most exported products. Medicines account for a large share of imports (4.4%), followed by automobiles. Trade with EU countries accounts for half of imports and exports. Italy and Germany are Greece's main trading partners, with Italy being the first destination for Greek exports (10.5%) and Germany the main supplier of goods and services (11.9%). Italy (8.3%), China (7.7%) and the Netherlands (6.1%) are the other main suppliers. Structurally in deficit, the trade balance improved between 2009 and 2016, with imports falling faster than exports. In 2020, exports of goods totaled US$35.1 billion (-7.4% YoY) while imports declined at a faster pace (-10.8% - to US$55.7 billion). In the same year, exports of services amounted to US$25.8 billion, marking a decline of 42.8%, imports decreasing slightly (-17.5% - to US$17.4 billion). The World Bank estimates the country's trade deficit at 7.6% of GDP in 2020, up from 1.7% a year earlier. Public spending has increased significantly in an attempt to combat the COVID-19 pandemic (estimated at 6.5% of GDP). In terms of public debt, Greece is once of the countries that has experienced the highest increase following the COVID-19 crisis, with an increase of 29% between 2019 and 2020, compared to 22% for the Spanish economy, for example. Public debt, which had been on a downward trend in recent years, soared by more than 25% of GDP in the aftermath of the pandemic. Although it is among the highest ratios in the world, it started to decline in 2021 (206.7% of GDP).

==== Governmental priorities ====
Following the COVID-19 pandemic and the resulting crisis, the EU and the European Commission have created a new recovery program, namely NextGeneration EU. The aim of this program is firstly to recover from the pandemic but also creating new economic and labor opportunities by transforming European economies. Greece has therefore designed a recovery and resilience plan. The various reforms and investments envisaged by this plan will allow the country to become more sustainable, more resilient, and also to be prepared for the challenges but also the opportunities of the green and digital transitions. Greece's recovery and resilience plan will include €17.77 billion in grants and €12.73 billion in loans. The program elaborated by Greece is in line with the recommendations of The European Semester. Indeed, the aim of the plan is to promote growth, productivity, job creation by achieving economic and social resilience in a country that has experienced a major economic crisis for the past decades. On the one hand, the reforms will enable sustainable and viable growth, and on the other hand, the investments will enhance the transition to a low-carbon, digital and more inclusive economy. Indeed, the plan will facilitate the decarbonisation of the economy, modernise and digitise public administration (including improving tax administration and judicial systems), promote innovation capacity and finally improve healthcare, education and active labour market policies. Key investments will be made to promote private investment, in the digital sector but also ecological and R&D. After having undertaken numerous privatizations under the austerity plans, Greece will be able to undertake public- private. In addition, country's key sectors are going to be pushed by key investments, such as culture, tourism, and agriculture. Greece's recovery and resilience plan will help boost economic growth and job creation. This will include increasing Greece's gross domestic product from 2.1% to 3.3% by 2026. This will enable approximately 62,000 Greek citizens to find employment. Greece will also benefit from the recovery and resilience plans of other EU member states, particularly through exports. First of all, with regard to climate and environmental policies and therefore the green transition, Greece will try to increase the share of renewable energy in the energy mix. In order to achieve this, the country will try to increase the number of offshore wind farms on the one hand and reduce the consumption of solid fossil fuels on the other. Investments will also be made to modernise private and public buildings, promote sustainable transport and support water management. Secondly, with regard to the digital transition, Greece has a lack of connectivity, a lack of digital skills, a slow adoption of digital technologies (especially by SMEs) and finally a low level of digital services in the public sector. In order to address this, the plan will support the digital transition including the digitalisation of public administration and private sector companies, but also connectivity and digital skills. In addition, various measures will be taken to strengthen economic and social resilience in order to promote labour market activation and skills upgrading, modernisation of public administration and simplification of the regulatory framework. Greece will also create a national public health programme, including the expansion of preventive services. Unemployment, especially among young people, being one of the major issues of the country, will also become a focus. Indeed, the program will be innovative in that sector through trainings, upskilling and reskilling with a focus on digital skills for all workers. In addition, many investments will be made in the health sector, an essential investment after this pandemic which has highlighted the lack of hospital resources, especially after the numerous fiscal cuts due to austerity measures. Investments in education and social inclusion will also be made. The recovery program will also try to simplify the business environment, both at local level and international level. The judicial system will also undergo reforms to be transformed into a more efficient system. In addition to the numerous reforms introduced to increase inclusion and productivity within the country, the plan also promotes the adoption of measures and incentives to develop and increase electronic transactions and limit corruption. Such measures in Greece could, if properly implemented, contribute to reducing the debt burden as more tax revenues will be collected. Reforms of public institutions will also be made in the coming months and years with a digitization of them. Greece's recovery plan was approved in June by the European Commission, allowing the country to acquire 17.8 billion euros in grants and 12.7 billion euros in loans on behalf of the European Recovery and Resilience Plan. Overall, 38% of the total envelope will support climate objectives and 23% will target a better digital transition within the country. The Bank of Greece concluded that at macroeconomic level, the country's stimulus package supported by the NextGenerationEU plan will allow an increase in real GDP by 7% by 2026 and the creation of 180,000 new jobs. Private sector investment is also expected to increase by 20%. These increases should be permanent thanks to a rebound in productivity in the country that will make this growth sustainable over time despite the increase in public debt due to the pandemic. The approval of the recovery plan by the Commission allows for the granting of a pre-financing of 4 billion euros, or 13% of the total amount, during the month of July. This plan will allow the country to adequately tackle, with a sufficient budget, the real problems of the GDP which strongly limits the growth of its economy but also strongly increases the inequalities within the country. In addition, the pandemic has forced countries around the world to go into debt to deal with the pandemic and the resulting humanitarian and economic crisis.

==== Resource allocation ====
The European Commission has already paid €4 billion to Greece. The country is expected to receive 30,5 billion in total (€17,8 billion in grants and €12.7 billion in loans). Greece is among the first countries to have received pre-financing under the RRF. This will allow the implementation of the investment and reform measures outlined in Greece's recovery and resilience plan. In Greece the RRF is financing investments and reforms that could have a transformative effect on the Greek economy and society. Some of these projects include:

• Green transition: 645 million to finance the interconnection with the Cyclades islands, increasing the potential for renewable energy sources and storage capacity.

• Digital transition: €375 million will enable the uptake of digital technologies, particularly by small and medium-sized enterprises, and support the purchase of digital services and new technology cash registers.

• Economic and social resilience: €740 million will be invested in strengthening active labour market policies to increase full-time employment, also for the long-term unemployed and disadvantaged people. 627 million will be invested in improving and digitalising public administration; digitalising the judicial system and speeding up court procedures; modernising and simplifying tax legislation.

=== Portugal ===
==== Economic effect ====
Following the spread of the COVID-19 pandemic, on 18 March 2020, a state of emergency was declared in Portugal with the implementation of social isolation measures in order to reduce contamination. The economy of Portugal has been strongly impacted by the closure of economic activities. The impact of COVID-19 was felt in all social and commercial activities, but more particularly in the tourism sector and especially in the hotel industry. In 2019, the tourism sector represented 16% of GDP.

In 2019 Portugal's GDP grew by 2.7%, which was better than expected. As a result of this increase, consumption and economic activity indicators predicted a strong position for Portugal in 2020. But the health crisis following the COVID-19 has resulted in significant costs for the country. In 2020, Portugal's GDP faced a historical recession of 8.4%. The unemployment rate in 2019 was 6.6% and increased to 7% in 2020. Exports of services and investment in equipment fell sharply in 2020. Private consumption has also fallen sharply, mainly due to a sharp rise in savings. But unlike the rest, investment in construction continued to grow, thanks in part to the various projects financed by the European Union.

==== Governmental priorities ====
On 1 May 2021, Portugal re-opened the country for tourism, which accounts for nearly 20% of GDP, allowing sport activities to resume, and letting venues in the hospitality sector stay open until 10.30pm. These changes will help improve economic confidence.

The Portuguese government has decided to implement an investment plan of more than six billion euros to revitalize the tourism sector. Part of this sum will be financed by the European recovery plan. Half of this sum, that is to say 3 billion euros will be used to support companies impacted by COVID-19 so that they can maintain their activities and save jobs. The plan also provides for aid for training in order to meet the challenges of digital technology and sustainable development.

Indeed, the Portuguese economy is only beginning to recover from the COVID-19 pandemic. According to the new OECD report, despite this recovery it is important to continue investment and structural reforms in order to raise living standards and strengthen public finances. To achieve this, Portugal will need to implement its EU-funded recovery and resilience plan to accelerate the digital and ecological transitions. The country will have to focus on measures with a high economic and social impact.

Following the COVID-19 pandemic and the resulting crisis, a recovery and resilience plan has been put in place in Portugal following the creation of NextGenerationEU, this plan was commonly called by the Portuguese society as the "European bazooka". The various reforms and investments envisaged by this plan will allow the country to become more sustainable, more resilient, and also to be prepared for the challenges but also the opportunities of the green and digital transitions. The Portuguese plan also includes reforms to increase the responsiveness and efficiency of health and care services. It also involves measures to improve the affordability of housing. Portugal's recovery and resilience plan will include €13.9 billion in grants and €2.7 billion in loans.

The Portuguese authorities designed the recovery plan after consultation with national and regional social partners and stakeholders, while continuing a close dialogue with the commission before formally submitting the plan on 22 April 2021. Portugal was then the first Member State to have presented its recovery plan. On 16 June 2021, the Commission gave its green light to the plan. On this occasion, President von der Leyen symbolically transmitted the commission's assessment to Prime Minister Antonio Costa during her visit in Lisbon. The plan was, in turn, adopted by the council on 13 July opening the door to its implementation and financing.

Portugal's recovery and resilience plan will help boost economic growth as well as employment creation. This will include increasing Portugal's gross domestic product from 1.5% to 2.4% by 2026. This will enable around 50,000 Portuguese citizens to find employment. Portugal will also benefit from the recovery and resilience plans of other EU Member States, notably through exports.

Following the pandemic crisis, Portugal's Recovery and Resilience Plan aims to address the urgent need to foster a strong recovery and prepare for Portugal's future. The plan's investments and reforms aim to help Portugal become more resilient, sustainable and better respond to the opportunities and challenges of green and digital transitions. In this context, the plan includes 83 investments and 32 reforms. They will be supported by 13.9 billion euros in grants and 2.7 billion euros in loans. 38% of the plan will support climate objectives and 22% of the plan will promote the digital transition.

Reforms focus on removing barriers to sustainable growth and investments address bottlenecks that are undermine potential growth and productivity. These barriers include restrictions on regulated professions and gaps in human capital, including education and digital skills. The plan also aims to improve the efficiency of public administration and the judicial system and public financial management. Moreover, reforms and investments in the Recovery plan support the competitiveness of the Portuguese economy, the catch-up in productivity and the convergence of incomes through commercial research, the innovation of digitization, the improvement of the energy efficiency of buildings, the capitalization of businesses, etc.

First of all, with regard to climate and environmental policies and therefore the green transition, Portugal has decided to implement an investment program to make its building stock more energy efficient. Secondly, regarding the digital transition, Portugal will invest in particular in the use of digital technologies in order to ensure access to quality education and training for all in order to improve the competitiveness of companies. Investments are also planned in digital health in order to modernize the computer systems of the national health service. Finally, various measures will be taken to strengthen economic and social resilience. On the one hand, regarding the social dimension, investments will be made to strengthen the National Health Service, to increase the supply of social housing solutions for various target groups, to increase the skill levels of the population and finally to extend the coverage of social services. On the other hand, in the economic dimension, investments will be made to strengthen research and innovation.

Finally, the Portuguese plan includes measures to strengthen the response capacity and efficiency of health and long-term care services and measures to make housing affordable. All reforms and investments need to be implemented in a tight timeframe as the Recovery and Resilience Facility regulation foresees that they should be completed by August 2026. According to estimates, the plan will increase Portugal's gross domestic product by 1.5% to 2.4% by 2026. This boost to the economy will lead to up to 50,000 citizens finding jobs.

However, the Portuguese Recovery and Resilience plan was subject to criticism. An editorialist from Público stressed that the government has missed a double opportunity to decarbonize and immediately finance investments that have been delayed for decades. According to her, the Costa government's project suffers from excessive centralization in the hands of the Minister of Planning, making predictable the worsening of territorial inequalities and the hyper-concentration of funding on the coast.

The strengthening of social programs, assistance to businesses, but also climate policy and the digital transition are the pillars of the strategy put in place by Lisbon in the plan. But some experts have doubts about the real impact of this plan to overcome the economic crisis caused by the COVID-19 pandemic. Joao Cesar das Neves, professor of economics at the Catholic University of Lisbon, stresses that the strategy is not centered on the pandemic and the immediate recovery but on the next generations. He analyzes that the plan strategy has two objectives that have not been affected by the pandemic, these are digitalization and decarbonization. He pointed out that these two areas have rather come to the fore during the pandemic.

==== Resource allocation ====
On 3 August 2021, The European Commission has disbursed €2.2 billion to Portugal in prefinancing, equivalent to 13% of the grant and loan component of the country's financial allocation. Portugal is one of the first countries receiving a pre-financing payment under the Recovery and Resilience Facility (RRF). This pre-financing aims to help to kick-start the implementation of the crucial investment and reform measures outlined in Portugal's recovery and resilience plan.

On 25 January 2022, Portugal submitted the first payment request of €1.16 billion and announced reforms in the areas of health, social housing, social services, investment and innovation, qualifications and skills, forestry, the blue economy, bioeconomy, renewable gases (including hydrogen), public finances and public administration. Several targets also concern investments in the areas of infrastructure, decarbonization of industry and digital education. With the payment request, the Portuguese authorities provided detailed and comprehensive evidence demonstrating the fulfilment of the 38 milestones and targets. The commission has thoroughly assessed this information before presenting its positive preliminary assessment of the payment request. The Portuguese plan a wide range of investment and reform measures in 20 thematic components. The plan will be supported by €13.9 billion in grants and €2.7 billion in loans, 13% of which (€2.2 billion) was disbursed to Portugal in pre-financing on 3 August 2021.

Green transition: Portugal's plan supports the green transition through an investment program of 300 million euros. The program aims to improve the energy efficiency of residential buildings. New investments are envisaged in the energy efficiency of public buildings. Industrial greening projects will also be supported with more than 800 million euros. Digital transition: Portugal's Recovery and Resilience Plan supports the digital transition with investments and reforms in the areas of skills, digitization of education and business as well as digitization of the public sector (general public administration, health, judicial system and tax administration). Economic and social resilience: The plan includes investments aimed, among other things, at strengthening the National Health Service (1.4 billion euros) and increasing the supply of social housing solutions for different targets (a total of 2.7 billion euros), to increase the level of qualification of the population.
