= European Union financial transaction tax =

Tax proposal made by the European Commission

EU financial transaction tax EU members requesting to participate EU members not participating

The European Union financial transaction tax (EU FTT) was a proposal made by the European Commission to introduce a financial transaction tax (FTT) within some of the member states of the European Union (EU).

The proposed EU financial transaction tax would have been separate from a bank levy, or a resolution levy, which some governments are proposing to impose on banks to insure them against the costs of any future bailouts. It was initially claimed the tax, as proposed, would raise 57 billion Euros per year if implemented across the entire EU.

The first proposal for the whole of the EU was presented by the European Commission in 2011 but did not reach a majority. Instead, the Council of the European Union authorized member states who wished to introduce the EU FTT to use enhanced co-operation. The Commission proposed a directive for an EU FTT in 2013 but the proposal stalled. In 2019 Germany and France released a proposal based on the French financial transaction tax and the finance ministers of the states participating in the enhanced cooperation came to the consensus that the EU FTT should be negotiated using this proposal.

According to early plans, the tax would impact financial transactions between financial institutions charging 0.1% against the exchange of shares and bonds and 0.01% across derivative contracts, if just one of the financial institutions resides in a member state of the EU FTT. To avoid an unwanted negative impact on the real economy, the FTT will not apply to:

1. Day-to-day financial activities of citizens and businesses (e.g. loans, payments, insurance, deposits etc.).
2. Investment banking activities in the context of raising capital.
3. Transactions carried out as part of restructuring operations.
4. Refinancing transactions with central banks and the ECB, with the EFSF and the ESM, and transactions with EU.

== History ==
On 28 June 2010, the European Union's executive said it will study whether the European Union should go alone in imposing a tax on financial transactions after G20 leaders failed to agree on the issue. The following day the European Commission called for Tobin-style taxes on the EU's financial sector to generate direct revenue for the European Union. At the same time it suggested to reduce existing levies coming from the 27 member states.

== European Commission proposal ==
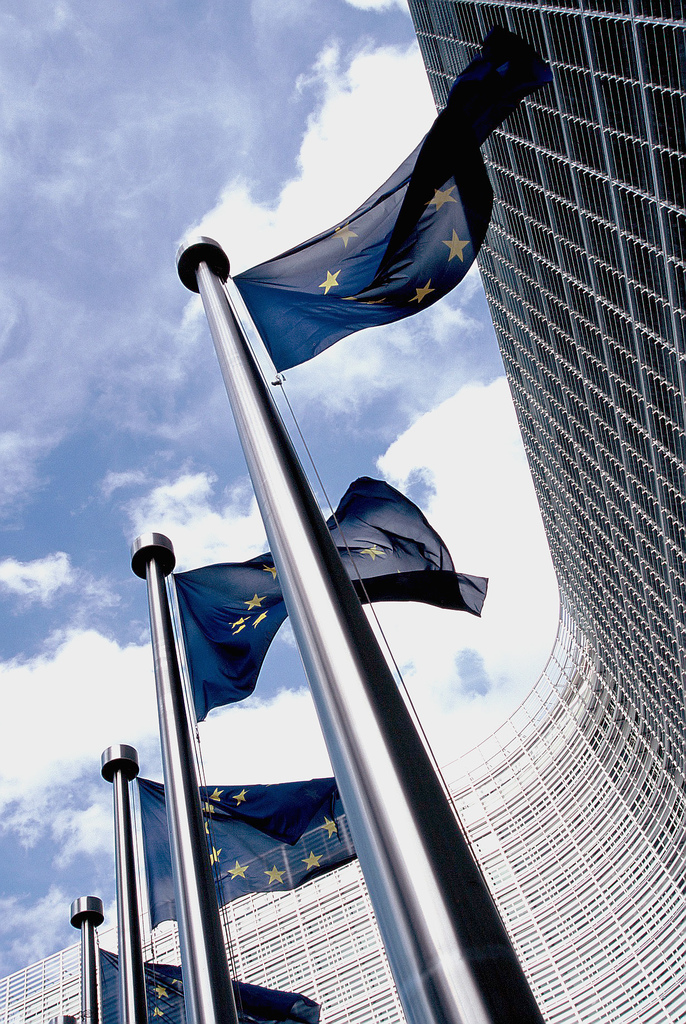
The building of the European Commission where the EU FTT proposal was drafted

On 28 September 2011, president of the European Commission José Barroso officially presented a plan to create a new financial transactions tax "to make the financial sector pay its fair share", pointing out that the financial sector received 4.6 trillion euros from EU member states during the crisis. In December 2012 the European Commission's State Aid Scoreboard revealed a new figure saying the volume of national support to the financial sector between October 2008 and 31 December 2011 amounted to around 1.6 trillion euros (13% of EU GDP), two-thirds of which came in the form of State guarantees on banks' wholesale funding.

Given 10 EU member states already have a form of a financial transaction tax in place, the proposal would effectively introduce new minimum tax rates and harmonise different existing taxes on financial transactions in the EU. According to the European Commission this would also "help to reduce competitive distortions in the single market, discourage risky trading activities and complement regulatory measures aimed at avoiding future crises".

The Commission proposal requires unanimity from the 27 Member States to pass. France, Germany, Spain, Belgium, Finland spoke in favor of the EU proposal. Austria and Spain are also known to support an EU FTT. Nations that oppose the proposal include the United Kingdom, Sweden, the Czech Republic and Bulgaria. Particularly the UK government has expressed strong views about the negative impact of the tax and is expected to use its power of veto to block the implementation of this proposal, unless the tax was to be introduced globally. The likelihood of a global FTT is low due to opposition from the United States. As a way out, advocates of the FTT such as the finance ministers from Germany, Austria and Belgium have suggested that the tax could initially be implemented only within the 17-nation eurozone, which would exclude reluctant governments like the United Kingdom and Sweden. If adopted, the EU FTT would have come into effect on 1 January 2014.

In October 2012, after discussions failed to establish unanimous support for an EU-wide FTT, the European Commission proposed that the use of enhanced co-operation should be permitted to implement the tax in the states which wished to participate. The proposal, supported by 11 EU member states representing more than 90% of Eurozone GDP was approved in the European Parliament in December 2012 and by the Council of the European Union in January 2013 with 4 EU members abstaining: Czech Republic, Luxembourg, Malta and the UK.

On 14 February 2013, the European Commission put forward a revised proposal outlining the details of the FTT to be enacted under enhanced co-operation, which was only slightly different from its initial proposal in September 2011. The proposal was approved by the European Parliament in July 2013, and must now be unanimously approved by the 11 initial participating states before coming into force. EU member states which have not signed up to the FTT are able to join the agreement in the future.

The legal service of the Council of the European Union concluded in September 2013 that the European Commission's proposal would not tax "systemic risk" activities but only healthy activities, and that it was incompatible with the EU treaty on several grounds while also being illegal because of "exceeding member states' jurisdiction for taxation under the norms of international customary law". The Financial Transaction Tax can no longer be blocked by the Council of the European Union on legal grounds, but each individual EU member state is still entitled to launch legal complaints against the FTT if approved to the European Court of Justice, potentially annulling the scheme. On 6 May 2014, ten out of the initial eleven participating member states (all except Slovenia) agreed to seek a "progressive" tax on equities and "some derivatives" by 1 January 2016, and aimed for a final agreement on the details to be negotiated and unanimously agreed upon later in 2014.

In June 2013, the commission announced that a January 2014 launch for the FTT was no longer realistic, but that it "could still enter into force towards the middle of 2014." The following month, Algirdas Šemeta, European Commissioner for Taxation and Customs Union, Audit and Anti-Fraud, said that "The Commission is ready to examine the suggestions made for an initial introduction of the tax with lower rates for products of specific market segments" including "both government bonds and pension funds." He left open the possibility the rate for these segments could be increased in the future.

On 6 May 2014, ten out of the initial eleven participating member states (all except Slovenia) agreed to seek a "progressive" tax on equities and "some derivatives" by 1 January 2016, and aimed for a final agreement on the details to be negotiated and unanimously agreed upon later in 2014.

In December 2015, Estonia announced that it no longer supports the financial transactions tax, due to concerns that the latest revised version of the tax would hardly generate any revenue, while at the same time scaring away traders.

The United Kingdom's withdraw from the EU in 2020 was expected complicate collection of the taxes, which has led to delays in negotiations.

In October 2025 the European Commission announced that it planned to withdraw the proposed directive on the FTT within six months. It formally withdrew the proposal in October 2026.

=== Scope ===
The tax would be levied on all transactions on financial instruments between financial institutions when at least one party to the transaction is located in the EU. It would cover 85% of the transactions between financial institutions (banks, investment firms, insurance companies, pension funds, hedge funds and others). House mortgages, bank loans to small and medium enterprises, contributions to insurance contracts, as well as spot currency exchange transactions and the raising of capital by enterprises or public bodies through the issuance of bonds and shares on the primary market would not be taxed, with the exception of trading bonds on secondary markets.

Revenue Estimate for EU Financial Transaction Tax
Tax base	Tax rate	Revenue estimate (€ billion)
Securities:		
Shares	0.1%	6.8
Bonds	0.1%	12.6
Derivatives:		
Equity linked	0.01%	3.3
Interest rate linked	0.01%	29.6
Currency linked	0.01%	4.8
EU total		57.1

Following the "R plus I" (residence plus issuance) solution an institution would pay the tax rate appropriate to the country of its residence, regardless of the location of the actual trade. In other words, the tax would cover all transactions that involve European firms, no matter whether these transactions take place within the EU or elsewhere in the world. If acting on behalf of a client, e.g., when acting as a broker, it would be able to pass on the tax to the client. Hence, it would be impossible for say French or German banks to avoid the tax by moving their transactions offshore.

=== Tax rate and revenues ===
Naturally estimated revenues may vary considerably depending on the tax rate but also on the assumed effect of the tax on trading volumes. An official study by the European Commission suggests a flat 0.01% tax would raise between €16.4bn and €43.4bn per year, or 0.13% to 0.35% of GDP. If the tax rate is increased to 0.1%, total estimated revenues were between €73.3bn and €433.9bn, or 0.60% to 3.54% of GDP.

The official proposal suggests a differentiated model, where shares and bonds are taxed at a rate of 0.1% and derivative contracts, at a rate of 0.01%. According to the European Commission this could approximately raise €57 billion every year. Much of the revenue would go directly to member states. The United Kingdom e.g. would receive around €10bn (£8.4bn) in additional taxes. The part of the tax that would be used as an EU own resource would be offset by reductions in national contributions. EU member states may decide to increase their part of the revenues by taxing financial transactions at a higher rate.

The levy that 11 Eurozone countries are expected to introduce could raise as much as €35bn a year.

=== Legal challenge ===
In March 2013, the UK's European Union Committee of the House of Lords urged the British government to challenge the FTT at the European Court of Justice due to concerns over the impact of the tax on non-participating states such as the UK. Lyndon Harrison, chair of the committee, suggested that "although the European Commission denies it, it is our view that UK authorities will be under an obligation to collect the tax." A report, commissioned by the City of London Corporation, which was published in April 2013 claimed that the tax would raise the UK's debt financing costs by £4 billion. On 3 April 2013, Czech Prime Minister Petr Nečas said that the FTT was unacceptable, and refused to rule out challenging it with the European Court of Justice.

In April 2013, George Osborne, the UK's Chancellor of the Exchequer, announced that his country had filed a legal challenge of the decision authorizing the use of enhanced cooperation to implement the FTT with the European Court of Justice. Osborne said that "we're not against financial transaction taxes in principle but we are concerned about the extra-territorial aspects of the Commission's proposal". A Finance Ministry spokesman said that "we will not stand in the way of other countries, but only if the rights of countries not taking part are respected" and that the current Commission proposal "does not meet these requirements." Luxembourg's Minister for Finance Luc Frieden said that his country was "very sympathetic" to the UK's legal challenge and would "bring arguments in support of the case".

On 30 April 2014, the European Court of Justice dismissed the United Kingdom's action against the authorization of the use of enhanced cooperation, but didn't rule out the possibility the UK could challenge the legality of the FTT itself if it is eventually approved. Osborne has threatened a new challenge if the FTT is approved.

== Evaluation and reception ==
European Commission

The European Commission itself expects the EU FTT to have the following impact on financial markets and the real economy:

- Up to a 90 per cent reduction in derivatives transactions (based on the Swedish experience).
- Slightly negative or positive effect on economic growth depending on the design of the EU FTT.
  A long-run (20-year) reduction in gross domestic product in the EU by 0.53% if "mitigating effects" take hold, or up to 1.76% if they don't. In May 2012 the EU Commission corrected its analysis and now predicts a slightly smaller negative impact on economic growth of 0.3%, and even a positive impact of at least 0.1% or €15bn if the generated tax revenues are spent on growth enhancing public investments. Algirdas Semeta, European Commissioner for taxation, customs, audit and anti-fraud argues that "if the projected €57bn (£47.7bn) per year is put towards consolidating national budgets, reducing other taxes or investing in public services and infrastructure, the direct economic effect of the FTT should be positive for growth and employment in Europe".
- An effective curb on automated high-frequency trading and highly leveraged derivatives
- An increase in capital costs, which could be mitigated by excluding primary markets for bonds and shares from the tax
- The real economy could be protected by ensuring the tax is levied only on secondary financial products, thus not affecting transactions such as salary payments, corporate and household loans

In its latest study from May 2012 the European Commission also dismissed the belief that financial institutions could avoid the tax by moving their transactions offshore, saying they could only do so by giving up all their European customers.

Council of the European Union

In an opinion dated 6 September 2013, the legal service of the Council of the European Union, assessing the European Commission's proposal, stated that it would tax activities that "are not liable to contribute to systemic risk and which are indispensable for the activities of non-financial business entities" and concluded that it was illegal because it "exceeds member states' jurisdiction for taxation under the norms of international customary law" and is not compatible with the EU treaty "as it infringes upon the taxing competences of non-participating member states". The opinion further stated that the tax would be in violation of the EU Treaty because it would be an obstacle to the free movement of capital and services and it would be "discriminatory and likely to lead to distortion of competition to the detriment of non-participating member states".

Algirdas Semeta, European Commissioner, responded to the opinion by stating that the commission would continue working on the FTT and that "the approach which has been taken in the proposal is the correct one and does not breach any provisions of the Treaty." A legal opinion prepared for the Commission which refuted the Council opinion was subsequently leaked. It argued that the FTT was "in conformity both with customary international law and EU primary law".

The Financial Transaction Tax can no longer be blocked by the Council of the European Union on legal grounds, but each individual EU member state is still entitled to launch legal complaints against the FTT if approved to the European Court of Justice, potentially annulling the scheme.

External experts

In February 2012, the Committee on Economic and Monetary Affairs of the European Parliament discussed the European Commission proposal with financial experts. Avinash Persaud of Intelligence Capital, Sony Kapoor of Re-Define and Stephany Griffith-Jones of Columbia University have all welcomed the suggested financial transaction tax which, they argued would hit the right players, such as high frequency traders and intermediary financial players, and not the real economy, and which could lead to a 0.25% increase in GDP. Griffith Jones and Persaud estimate the positive impact on economic growth to amount to at least €30bn until 2050. At the Committee meeting Griffith-Jones and Persaud presented a report which goes into more detail about this position, claiming that an FTT could lead to an 0.25% increase in GDP on the assumption that the FTT would "decrease the probability of crises by a mere 5%". However, they do not believe that a Financial Transaction Tax on its own would prevent financial crises. The authors argue:

"the FTT would somewhat reduce systemic risk, and therefore the likelihood of future crises. We are clearly not arguing that on its own, the FTT would reduce the risk of crises, as prudent macroeconomic policies and effective financial regulation as well as supervision also have a major role to play in crisis prevention. However, by significantly reducing the level of noise trading in general and reducing (or eliminating) high frequency trading in particular, the FTT would make some contribution to the reduction of severe misalignments and hence the probability of violent adjustments. Moreover, in financial crises "gross" exposures matter more than the net ones, and financial transaction taxes will reduce the gap between the two. The growth costs of crises are massive. For example, Reinhart (2009) estimates that, from peak to trough, the average fall in per capita GDP, as result of major financial crises, was 9%. The Institute of Fiscal Studies (2011) has recently estimated that for the UK, when comparing the real median income household income in 2009–2010 with 2012–2013, the decline will be 7.4%. Of course for European countries directly hit by the sovereign debt crisis, like Greece, the decline of GDP and incomes will be far higher."

In May 2012, member of the executive board of the European Central Bank Jörg Asmussen also spoke out in favour of an EU FTT, citing additional revenues and justice to be the main reasons.

Former International Monetary Fund Chief Economist Kenneth Rogoff is critical of a FTT, saying "Europeans concluded that an FTT's political advantages outweigh its economic flaws... there certainly is a case to be made that an FTT has so much gut-level popular appeal that politically powerful financial interests could not block it." Similarly, Oxera, the Sveriges Riksbank (Swedish National Bank) and the Netherlands Bureau for Economic Policy Analysis have all come out with detailed analysis and criticisms of the proposed EU FTT.

== Public opinion ==
A Eurobarometer poll of more than 27,000 people published in January 2011 found that Europeans are strongly in favour of a financial transaction tax by a margin of 61% to 26%. Of those, more than 80% agree that if global agreement cannot be reached – a FTT should, initially, be implemented in just the EU. Support for a FTT, in the UK, is 65%. Another survey published earlier by YouGov suggests that more than four out of five people in the UK, France, Germany, Spain and Italy think the financial sector has a responsibility to help repair the damage caused by the economic crisis. The poll also indicated strong support for a FTT among supporters of all the three main UK political parties.

== Position of member states ==
=== Requested participation in enhanced co-operation ===
The following 10 countries are participating in the proposal of the European Commission to implement a FTT using enhanced co-operation. (Estonia was originally part of the request but subsequently removed itself from the negotiations):

- Austria
- Belgium
- France: In 2001, the French National Assembly passed a Tobin tax amendment, which was overturned by the French Senate in March 2002. On 1 August 2012, newly elected French president Francois Hollande introduced a 0.2 percent FTT, which was expected to generate €170 million in additional revenues for 2012 and another €500 million in 2013.

An amendment to the law, extending the tax to include intra-day trades was also proposed but in October 2013 it was reported that the French government was opposed to a tax on intra-day transactions, which account for over half the volume of Euronext Paris, the existing French tax having been blamed for loss of business and a negative effect on share prices.

- Germany: On 10 December 2009 the Chancellor of Germany Angela Merkel revised her position in favour of an EU FTT.
- Greece
- Italy: In January 2012, new Italian prime minister Mario Monti said Italy had changed track and now backed the push for a FTT, but he also warned countries against going it alone. Italian ambassador to the EU, Ferdinando Nelli Feroci, said in April 2013 that "transactions on government bonds must be excluded" from the FTT for his country to participate in the tax.
- Portugal
- Slovakia
- Slovenia: On 6 May 2014, Slovenia was the only state of the 11 FTT participating states which did not sign a declaration on seeking to finalize an agreement on the tax. Prime Minister Alenka Bratušek said the government opposed the latest FTT proposal drafted on 6 May 2014 – and considered withdrawing as a signatory to the enhanced cooperation agreement – since the original plan for a "broad tax base" had been substantially narrowed. Projections for latest FTT proposal were that the country would only receive €3 million of increased tax revenues while facing increased tax collection expenses of around €2 million.
- Spain

=== Opposing countries ===
- Bulgaria: Bulgaria is opposed to the EU FTT. In 2011, the country's Finance Ministry said that "the introduction of the Financial Transactions Tax on an EU level, before reaching an agreement to introduce it on a global level, will endanger the competitiveness of financial centres in the EU."
- Cyprus: The German opposition Social Democratic Party has stated that Cyprus joining the FTT is a requirement for their support of Cyprus' request for a bailout from the European Stability Mechanism. However, Nicos Anastasiades, elected President of Cyprus in February 2013, is opposed to the FTT and Michael Sarris, Minister of Finance of Cyprus, has rejected adopting the FTT. In March 2013, after reaching an agreement with eurozone leaders on terms for their bailout, Sarris said "we have managed to avoid any tax on financial transactions that would be catastrophic for our economy".
- Czech Republic: The government of the Czech Republic is opposed to the EU FTT. Czech Prime Minister Petr Nečas said in April 2013 that the tax would harm the competitiveness of the EU's financial sector. However, the Senate of the Czech Republic, which is controlled by the opposition Czech Social Democratic Party, has supported the FTT. In December 2012 the Senate passed a resolution supporting the use of enhanced co-operation to implement the FTT and recommending that the Czech government reconsider joining the tax. Bohuslav Sobotka, the leader of Social Democratic Party which was leading in the polls by October 2012 and could take power after elections no later than May 2014, has stated that his government would support the EU FTT. Mojmír Hampl, Vice-Governor of the Czech National Bank, has stated that the central bank opposes the FTT due to the potential negative impacts on the economy.
- Denmark: Denmark opposes a FTT if applied only in the European Union. Margrethe Vestager, Minister of the Economy from 2011 till 2014, has stated in October 2013 that Denmark "will not be participating in a strengthened co-operation with a financial transaction tax". While they weren't among the original 11 states who signed up to the enhanced co-operation procedure, they encouraged the participating states to keep the FTT open for them to join in the future, should they decide to adopt the tax.
- Luxembourg: In December 2011, Prime Minister of Luxembourg, Jean-Claude Juncker, backed the EU FTT, saying Europe can't refrain from "the justice that needs to be delivered" out of consideration for London's financial industry. However, on 13 March 2012 the government officially opposed the EU FTT. Luxembourgs Minister for Finance Luc Frieden has said that his country was "not opposed philosophically" to a FTT, but that it must be implemented globally, and not regionally. Luxembourg supports the UK's legal challenge of the FTT.
- Malta: Malta opposes a FTT due to concerns, expressed in 2011 by then Prime Minister Lawrence Gonzi, that it would harm the competitiveness of the country's financial sector.
- Sweden: The former liberal-conservative government of Sweden opposed a FTT if applied only in the European Union due to their experience when they introduce a domestic FTT that resulted in an exodus of capital from their financial sector. However, they encouraged the participating states to keep the FTT open for them to join in the future, should they decide to adopt the tax. The current (post September 2014) Social Democrat – Green Party government is open to the idea of a FTT. It wants to monitor the effect of the tax in the participating countries and make a later decision based on that.
- United Kingdom: The British government supports a FTT only if implemented worldwide. In 2009, Adair Turner (chair) and Hector Sants (CEO) of the UK Financial Services Authority both supported the idea of new global taxes on financial transactions. The governor of the Bank of England Mervyn King dismissed the idea of a "Tobin tax" on 26 January 2010, saying: "Of all the components of radical reform, I think a Tobin tax is bottom of the list ... It’s not thought to be the answer to the 'Too Big to Fail' problem – there's much more support for the idea of a US-type levy". The UK has filed a legal challenge with the ECJ over the FTT.

=== Other countries ===
- Croatia acceded to the EU in July 2013, making them eligible to participate in the EU FTT.
- Estonia: In September 2011, Estonia was among the 11 EU countries that declared seeking a political agreement for financial transaction taxation. However, on 8 December 2015 Estonia declared it would not sign up to the agreement, because of worries that as most of the shares traded by its financial institutions are issued outside the participating group, it would hardly get any revenue. At the same time, its traders would have an incentive to move their business elsewhere. It formally withdrew from the FTT enhanced cooperation procedure on 16 March 2016.
- Finland was originally among the nine EU member states pushing for an EU FTT, but it was not among the states which requested the use of enhanced co-operation. The governing parties of Finland are divided over whether to join the EU FTT.
- Hungary is supportive of a FTT, and on 16 July 2012 introduced a unilateral 0.1 percent FTT to be implemented in January 2013. While they weren't among the original 11 states who signed up to the enhanced co-operation procedure, they encouraged the participating states to keep the FTT open for them to join in the future, should they decide to adopt the tax.
- Ireland is in favour of an EU-wide FTT, but not of a Eurozone FTT. Irish Minister of Finance Michael Noonan has stated that Ireland won't join the EU FTT unless the UK does.
- Latvia has been cautious about the FTT due to concerns over loss of competitiveness of their financial sector. However, in January 2013 the Saeima's European Affairs Committee authorized the Latvian Ministry of Finance to express their support for the states seeking to implement the tax and to begin working more closely with them on it. Subsequently, the Latvian Ministry of Finance welcomed the release of the EC's draft FTT proposal and promised to evaluate it before deciding whether to join.
- Lithuania originally did not plan on participating in the EU FTT enhanced co-operation, but after a parliamentary election in October 2012 new Prime Minister Algirdas Butkevicius announced that Lithuania would join the EU FTT by January 2013. However, in January the government decided to postpone joining the EU FTT due to uncertainty about the details of the proposed tax. Rimantas Šadžius, Lithuania's Minister of Finance, stated that "we do not rule out the possibility that in the future, after assessment of the benefits of such a tax and possible risks, Lithuania may decide to participate in this initiative."
- Netherlands: In October 2011, Dutch prime minister Mark Rutte said his cabinet supported a FTT but opposed its introduction in only a few countries. Nevertheless, the country blocked the introduction of EU FTT in March 2012. In October 2012 the new coalition government said that it would adopt the proposed EU FTT provided that it was not imposed on pension funds. However, when the European Commission's proposal for the FTT was released in February 2013, it did not exclude pensions funds, which led the Dutch Finance Minister Jeroen Dijsselbloem to respond by saying that he was "disappointed with this proposal and will work hard to change it" and that the Netherlands would take some time to decide whether they should join the tax. Dijsselbloem said in April that "the Dutch would still like to join" the FTT but that "our conditions have not been met".
- Poland considered joining the EU FTT. However, Jan Vincent-Rostowski, the Polish Minister of Finance, decided to maintain neutrality, stating that they would not block the tax and that they would observe it "with benevolent neutrality" to "see if those who claim that financial transactions will not move to other financial centers are right or not."
- Romania has stated that they would support an EU-wide FTT. While they weren't among the original 11 states who signed up to the enhanced co-operation procedure, they encouraged the participating states to keep the FTT open for them to join in the future, should they decide to adopt the tax.

== See also ==
- ATTAC (Association for the Taxation of Financial Transactions for the Aid of Citizens)
- Bank tax
- Exorbitant privilege
- Financial markets
- Fluctuation in exchange rates
- Foreign exchange controls
- Foreign exchange market
- Money market
- Noise (economic)
- Robin Hood tax
- Spahn tax
- Speculation
- Speculative attack
- Tobin tax
- Transfer tax
- Volatility (finance)
- Volatility risk
- 2008–2009 Keynesian resurgence

Related economic crises

- 2008 financial crisis
- European sovereign debt crisis
