= Swedish financial transaction tax =

Financial transaction tax between 1984 and 1991

The Swedish financial transaction tax was a 0.5% financial transaction tax (FTT) applied to equity securities, fixed income securities and financial derivatives between 1984 and 1991.

== History ==
In January 1984, Sweden introduced a 0.5% tax on the purchase or sale of an equity security. Hence, a round trip (purchase and sale) transaction resulted in a 1% tax. The tax applied to all equity security trades in Sweden using local brokerage services as well as to stock options. In July 1986, the rate was doubled, and in January 1989, a considerably lower tax of 0.002% on fixed-income securities was introduced (applying only for those with a maturity of 90 days or less). On a bond with a maturity of five years or more, the tax was 0.003%. 15 months later, on 15 April 1990, the tax on fixed-income securities was abolished. In January 1991 the rates on the remaining taxes were cut by half and by the end of the year, they were also abolished completely. Once the taxes were eliminated, trading volumes returned and grew substantially in the 1990s.

== Market reaction ==
On the day that the tax was announced, share prices fell by 2.2%. But there was leakage of information prior to the announcement, which might explain the 5.35% price decline in the 30 days prior to the announcement. When the tax was doubled, prices again fell by another 1%. These declines were in line with the capitalized value of future tax payments resulting from expected trades. It was further felt that the taxes on fixed-income securities only served to increase the cost of government borrowing, providing another argument against the tax.

Even though the tax on fixed-income securities was much lower than that on equities, the impact on market trading was much more dramatic. During the first week of the tax, the volume of bond trading fell by 85%, even though the tax rate on five-year bonds was only 0.003%. The volume of futures trading fell by 98% and the options trading market disappeared. 60% of the trading volume of the eleven most actively traded Swedish share classes moved to the UK after the announcement in 1986 that the tax rate would double. 30% of all Swedish equity trading moved offshore. By 1990, more than 50% of all Swedish trading had moved to London. Foreign investors reacted to the tax by moving their trading offshore while domestic investors reacted by reducing the number of their equity trades. According to Anders Borg who served as finance minister in the Swedish government from 2006 to 2014, "between 90%-99% of traders in bonds, equities and derivatives moved out of Stockholm to London."

== Revenues ==
As a result, revenues from these taxes were disappointing. For example, revenues from the tax on fixed-income securities were initially expected to amount to 1,500 million Swedish kronor per year, but they did not amount to more than 80 million Swedish kronor in any year, with the yearly average being closer to 50 million. In addition, as taxable trading volumes fell, so did revenues from capital gains taxes, entirely offsetting revenues from the equity transactions tax that had grown to 4,000 million Swedish kronor by 1988.

== See also ==
- ATTAC (Association for the Taxation of Financial Transactions for the Aid of Citizens)
- Financial markets
- Financial transaction tax
- Foreign exchange market
- Money market
- Speculation
- Tobin tax
- Transfer tax
- Volatility (finance)
- Volatility risk
