= Bank transaction tax =

Form of tax

A bank transaction tax is a tax levied on debit (and/or credit) entries on bank accounts. In 1989, at the Buenos Aires meetings of the International Institute of Public Finance, University of Wisconsin–Madison Professor of Economics Edgar L. Feige proposed extending the tax reform ideas of John Maynard Keynes, James Tobin and Lawrence Summers, to their logical conclusion, namely to tax all transactions. Feige's Automated Payment Transaction tax (APT tax) proposed taxing the broadest possible tax base at the lowest possible tax rate. Since all transactions must ultimately be paid for by a final means of payment, namely via a transfer from a bank account or by settlement with currency, Feige proposed collecting his tax by levying the tax automatically on the debit and credit entries to bank accounts, thereby splitting the tax between the buyer and seller of every transaction. The APT tax is a uniform flat-rate tax on all transactions, assessed and collected automatically whenever there is a debit or credit entry to a bank account. As such, it can be viewed as a bank transaction tax. Since financial transactions account for the greatest component of the APT tax base, and since all financial transactions are taxed, the proposal eliminates substitution possibilities for evasion and avoidance. The goal of the APT tax is to significantly improve economic efficiency, enhance stability in financial markets, and reduce to a minimum the costs of tax administration (assessment, collection, and compliance costs). The Automated Payment Transaction tax proposal was presented to the President's Advisory Panel on Federal Tax Reform in 2005. It can be automatically collected by a central counterparty in the clearing or settlement process.

Patrick R Colabella and Richard Coppinger, Professors of Accounting and Taxation at St John's University, New York introduced a variant version of the (APT tax) tax called the Withdrawals tax at an International Conference on tax reform at the World Trade Center in 1999. The WTX as it is called, taxes only withdrawals from designated personal and business bank accounts and can raise $9.3 trillion at a rate of 5% of a tax base of $186 trillion. The concept was also submitted to the President's Advisory Panel on Federal Tax Reform in 2005. It was reintroduced in 2016 in the book "How to get Rid of Socialism and Cure the Fiscal Ills of the United States of America." It makes the case for replacing the income tax, sales tax, and estate tax and demonstrates that by eliminating these tax systems it would effectively constrain Socialist redistribution programs that are income tax based. The book also claims the utility of the WTX system of taxation effectively extends to the control of the shadow economy and cyber currencies and that the WTX can generate enough revenue to electronically fund all economic security obligations of the federal government ( I.e.Social Security and Medicare).

== History ==
=== Australian bank account debits tax ===
Australia charged a tax on customer withdrawals from bank accounts with a cheque facility (both withdrawals made by cheque or by another means, such as EFTPOS).

The tax was introduced by the federal government in 1982. The power to levy the tax was transferred to the states in 1990, except for Norfolk Island which did not charge it. The tax was abolished by the states on dates between 1 July 2002 and 1 July 2005 as part of the package of reforms for the introduction of the goods and services tax.

=== Latin America ===
As globalization eroded the efficiency of conventional taxes such as value added taxes, various Latin American countries applied new taxation levied on bank transactions. Argentina introduced a bank transaction tax in 1984 before it was abolished in 1992.

In 1993 Brazil implemented a temporary "CPMF" tax at a rate between 0.25% and 0.38% to fund its health system. The tax lasted until 2007. In 2011, during the presidential election, there was renewed discussion about a possible re-introduction of the CPMF under the name "Social contribution for health" (CSS).

The broad-based tax levied on all debit (or credit) entries on bank accounts proved to be evasion-proof, more efficient and less costly than orthodox tax models. Furthermore, the significant revenue-raising capacity of bank transactions taxation revived the centuries-old ideal of the Single Tax.

In 1998 Ecuador introduced the "Impuesto a la circulacion de capitales" or tax on money circulation, at a rate of 1% of deposits made into Financial Institutions. This tax was introduced in lieu of Income Tax and was meant to provide an amount of revenue at least equal to income tax without the administrative cost of such a tax. The initial result of this tax was massive withdrawals of cash from Banks prior to the tax being charged and disintermediation as economic agents avoided the use of banks to avoid the tax. Revenues from this tax was about half of the expected and halfway through 1999 Income tax was reintroduced, and the tax rate reduced to 0.80%. In the year 2000 the tax was repealed.

== See also ==
- Bank account debits tax
- Bank tax
- Financial markets
- Financial transaction tax
- Money market
- Tobin tax
- Transfer tax
