= Reaction to the Tobin tax =

Listing of notable reaction to James Tobin's 1972 tax proposal

This article is a list of all notable reaction to James Tobin's 1972 proposal of what is now known as the Tobin tax.

== Government officials ==
=== From 1990 to 1999 ===
- 1994 - In Canada, economist Rodney Schmidt's research, beginning in the spring of 1994, "came about because Finance Minister Paul Martin himself had expressed an interest in the Tobin tax and the possibility of raising it at the June, 1995 Group of 7 meeting in Halifax." (This was before the December, 1994 economic crisis in Mexico.)
- 1994 - "Lloyd Bentsen, who was at the time United States Secretary of the Treasury, was supportive ... he began raising the subject informally at the regular meetings of G7 finance ministers".
- In 1996, in New Zealand, Don Brash, when he was the Governor of the Reserve Bank, stated that a Tobin tax in New Zealand would not have the desired effect of reducing the volume of international financial transactions or in reducing market volatility.
- 1999 - Supporter - Canada - On March 23, 1999 the House of Commons of Canada passed a resolution directing the government to "enact a tax on financial transactions in concert with the international community." (The Tobin tax was revived largely through the efforts of Canadian activists and broad public support in the 1990s)

=== From 2000 to 2004 ===
- 2000 - Supporters - Finnish Government
- In late 2001, a Tobin tax amendment was adopted by the French National Assembly. However, it was overturned by March 2002 by the French Senate.
- 2001 - Supporter: Fidel Castro - At the UN September 2001 World Conference against Racism, when the issue of compensation for colonialism and slavery arose in the agenda, Fidel Castro, the President of Cuba, advocated the Tobin Tax to address that issue. (According to Cliff Kincaid, Castro advocated it "specifically in order to generate U.S. financial reparations to the rest of the world," however a closer reading of Castro's speech shows that he never did mention "the rest of the world" as being recipients of revenue.) Castro cited Holocaust reparations as a previously established precedent for the concept of reparations.
- In January, 2003, in Latin America, the Tobin tax was supported by the president of Brazil, Luiz Inácio Lula da Silva, and the president of Venezuela, Hugo Chávez.
- On June 15, 2004, the Commission of Finance and Budget in the Belgian Federal Parliament approved a bill implementing a Spahn tax.
- June 2004 - Supporters - 864 Parliamentarians and government officials around the world: "An effort to mobilize support among parliamentarians around the world resulted in 864 signatures to a pro-Tobin tax resolution by June 2004" Officials were from Argentina, Australia, Austria, Belgium, Brazil, Cameroon, Canada, Costa Rica, Ivory Coast, Denmark, Djibouti, Finland, France, Germany, Greece, India, Ireland, Italy, Luxemburg, Madagascar, Mali, Mexico, Netherlands, New Zealand, Norway, Portugal, Senegal, South Africa, Spain, Sweden, Switzerland, UK, USA

=== From 2005 to 2008 ===
- In early November 2007, a regional Tobin tax was adopted by the Bank of the South, after an initiative of Presidents Hugo Chavez from Venezuela and Néstor Kirchner from Argentina.

=== In 2009 ===
- September 19, 2009 - Supporter - Government of France
- September 24, 2009 - Paul Volcker (former US Federal Reserve chairman) - "said he was “very interested” by ideas for a tax on transactions between banks, which was floated ... by Peer Steinbrück, German finance minister, and by Lord Turner, head of the UK Financial Services Authority." (Also see Volcker's position of Dec 13, 2009, below)
- October 20, 2009 - Supporter - Government of Brazil
- In early November 2009, at the G20 finance ministers summit in Scotland, the British Prime Minister Gordon Brown raised the idea of a tax on financial transactions, but did not go into specific details.
- In early November, 2009, the US Treasury Secretary Timothy Geithner advised the US does not support the Tobin Tax.
- In November 2009, at the G20 finance ministers summit, the representatives of the minority government of Canada spoke publicly on the world stage in opposition to the House of Commons of Canada 1999 resolution to "enact a tax on financial transactions in concert with the international community." Canada's finance minister, Jim Flaherty, restated Canada's opposition to a Tobin tax. Flaherty said, "It is not something we would be interested in here in Canada. We are not in the business of raising taxes, we are in the business of lowering taxes in Canada. It is not an idea we would look at."
- December 3, 2009 - Supporters - 22 representatives in the United States House of Representatives supported the US "Let Wall Street Pay for the Restoration of Main Street Bill" which contained a financial transaction tax (not an international tax)
- December 3, 2009 - Supporter of a G20 financial transaction tax: Nancy Pelosi, Speaker of the United States House of Representatives
- December 10, 2009 - Supporter - Angela Merkel, Chancellor of Germany
- On December 11, 2009, the Financial Times reported the following: "Since the Nov 7 [2009] summit of the G20 Finance Ministers, the head of the International Monetary Fund, Mr Strauss-Kahn seems to have softened his doubts, telling the CBI employers' conference: 'We have been asked by the G20 to look into financial sector taxes. ... This is an interesting issue. ... We will look at it from various angles and consider all proposals.'"
- December 13, 2009 - Paul Volcker, chairman of the US Economic Recovery Advisory Board under President Barack Obama, said he "instinctively opposed" any tax on financial transactions. "But it may be worthwhile to look into the current proposals as long as the result is not predetermined. That would at least end all this renewed talk about the idea, but overall I am skeptical about these ideas." (Also see Volcker's position of Sept 24, 2009, above)

=== In 2010 ===
- On January 26, 2010, Bank of England Governor Mervyn King dismissed the idea of a “Tobin tax”. “Of all the components of radical reform, I think a Tobin tax is bottom of the list,” said Mr King. “It’s not thought to be the answer to the 'Too Big to Fail' problem - there’s much more support for the idea of a US-type levy.”
- Feb 5, 2010 - Supporter - Christine Lagarde, the Minister of Economic Affairs, Industry and Employment of France
- May 20, 2010, German officials were understood to favor a financial transaction tax over a financial activities tax.

=== In 2011 ===
- June 29, 2011, the European Commission called for Tobin-style taxes on the EU's financial sector to generate direct revenue starting from 2014. At the same time it suggested to reduce existing levies coming from the 27 member states.

== Non-government supporters and opponents ==
=== 1936 to 1989 ===
- 1936 - Among the first proponents of a financial transaction tax was John Maynard Keynes, who first proposed his version in 1936.
- 1972 - Author of "Tobin tax" James Tobin
- 1989 - Supporter: Lawrence Summers, former president of Harvard University and economic advisor of US president Bill Clinton

=== 1990 to 1999 ===
- June 16, 1995, Paul Bernd Spahn opposed the original form of the Tobin tax and proposed his own variation (see Spahn tax).
- On August 1, 1995, an IMF Working Paper No. 95/77 Financial Transactions Taxes by Shome, Parthasrathi and Stotsky, Janet Gale found that "the economic effects of financial transactions taxes on capital markets are seen to be pervasive. They may impose significant efficiency costs by impairing the smooth functioning of financial markets, increasing the cost of capital, and distorting the structure of capital financing. Their effects on the volatility of capital flows, either in domestic or international financial markets, are uncertain, as are their distributional and revenue effects."
- 1997 - Supporter - Ignacio Ramonet
- 1998 - Supporter - Economics writer Linda McQuaig
- 1998 - Supporters - ATTAC (Association for the Taxation of Financial Transactions for the Aid of Citizens)

=== 2000 to 2004 ===
- In 2001 the charity War on Want released The Robin Hood Tax, a report explaining the case for a currency transactions tax. War on Want also sets up the Tobin Tax Network to develop the proposal and press for its introduction.
- 2001 - The Guardian wrote that Tobin Tax would make everyone poorer. The liquidity on the currency market would decrease, the prices would become more volatile and transporting goods would become more difficult and expensive. According to The Guardian, speculators are needed to risk their money so that liquidity would be better.
- 2001 - September 19 - Speculator George Soros, put forward a different proposal, special drawing rights or SDRs that the rich countries would pledge for the purpose of providing international assistance, without necessarily dismissing the Tobin tax idea. He stated, "It is not at all clear to me that a Tobin tax would reduce volatility in the currency markets. It is true that it may discourage currency speculation but it would also reduce the liquidity of the marketplace."
- In 2001, the International Monetary Fund conducted considerable research that opposes a transaction tax. In 2001, findings by Habermeier, Karl Friedrich, and Andrei Kirilenko, state that "transaction taxes or such equivalents as capital controls can have negative effects on price discovery, volatility, and liquidity and lead to a reduction in the informational efficiency of markets." (See also IMF position of 2010, below)

=== 2005 to 2008 ===
- In 2006, Markku Lanne and Timo Vesala of University of Helsinki write in the Bank of Finland Research Discussion Paper No. 11/2006 The Effect of a Transaction Tax on Exchange Rate Volatility(2006) that "a transaction tax is likely to amplify, not dampen, volatility in foreign exchange markets."
- In September 2006, George Monbiot argues in favour of a Tobin Tax, in his book Heat: How to Stop the Planet Burning.

=== 2009 ===
- In August, 2009, Adair Turner, chair of the United Kingdom Financial Services Authority, in an interview for Prospect magazine supported the idea of new global taxes on financial transactions, warning that a “swollen” financial sector paying excessive salaries has grown too big for society.
- October 5, 2009 - Supporter - Joseph Stiglitz (recipient of the Nobel Memorial Prize in Economic Sciences in 2001 and the John Bates Clark Medal in 1979, and former Senior Vice President and Chief Economist of the World Bank.)
- In early November 2009, the "Lex" column of Financial Times opposes the Tobin tax, in "Tobin or not Tobin" it writes "The Tobin tax should remain a curiosity of economic history."
- In November 2009, Matthew Sinclair, Research Director of the TaxPayers' Alliance, wrote an article in the London newspaper City AM A Tobin Tax would destroy London without making the world safer
- In late November 2009 Paul Krugman, New York Times columnist and professor of Economics and International Affairs at Princeton University, argued that a Tobin Tax would have ameliorated the 2008 financial crisis. He wrote, "bad investments aren’t the whole story of the crisis. What turned those bad investments into catastrophe was the financial system’s excessive reliance on short-term money ... a financial transactions tax, by discouraging reliance on ultra-short-run financing, would have made such a run much less likely. So contrary to what the skeptics say, such a tax would have helped prevent the current crisis — and could help us avoid a future replay." Krugman wrote that it is "an idea whose time has come."
- In late November 2009, Economist Charles Goodhart, Professor Emeritus of Banking and Finance at London School of Economics and developer of Goodhart's law, was scathing in his criticism of "radical and consumer groups [that] go on backing the Tobin tax idea". He argued, "Many of those who support such a tax neither know, nor care, what effects it might have on market efficiency. Besides a, generally misguided view that its imposition would fall primarily on the financial sector, rather than be passed on to its customers, the hope is that such a tax would produce lots of lovely revenue, to be spent on good deeds, such as foreign aid."
- December 7, 2009, economist Stephany Griffith-Jones advocated a very low but "internationally co-ordinated tax on financial transactions, often described as a Tobin tax."
- December 7, 2009 - Supporter - Hector Sants, Chief Executive Officer of the United Kingdom Financial Services Authority

=== 2010 ===
- February 15, 2010 - The Asia-Pacific Economic Cooperation Business Advisory Council, wrote to the IMF opposing a global transaction tax. The Council wrote:

(The) imposition of a global tax is an inappropriate response and a further burden to industries, especially small and medium enterprises, and consumers during the 2008 financial crisis. We also believe that the proposals under consideration would be harmful for a range of additional reasons, including the practical challenges of implementing any such tax.

- 31 March 2010 - "350 economists, including Jeffrey Sachs and the Nobel laureate Joseph Stiglitz, from more than 35 countries signed a letter to the leaders of the Group of 20 countries calling on them to impose a tax on financial transactions between financial institutions, but not on transactions conducted by individuals." The then leaders of Europe's three biggest economies - Angela Merkel of Germany, Nicolas Sarkozy of France and Gordon Brown of Britain -were "promoting a financial transaction tax as a way of raising as much as $US 400billion a year to fulfil commitments to domestic budgets, poverty reduction, global health and climate change mitigation." A coalition of community organizations in Australia also supported the tax.
- April 16, 2010 - International Monetary Fund - "While the IMF does not endorse a Financial Transaction Tax (FTT), it concedes that 'The FTT should not be dismissed on grounds of administrative practicality.' This is important because the Fund might have rejected it outright. However, the IMF interprets its mandate from the G20 quite narrowly and therefore does not endorse the FTT on the grounds that it 'does not appear well suited to the specific purposes set out in the [2009/2010] mandate from the G-20 leaders.'" (See also IMF position of 2001, above)

=== 2011 ===
- October 10, 2011 - Charity group Oxfam, which is campaigning for a financial transaction tax, banned a pensioner from one of its shops, after he complained about a poster which highlighted Oxfam's call for a “Robin Hood” tax of banks and financial institutions. Pensioner Barry Nowlan has incurred £10,000 in legal fees fighting the ban. Nowlan, 63, of Taunton, says he has a legitimate complaint about Oxfam's “political campaigning.”
- November 2, 2011 - Microsoft founder Bill Gates in an interview with the BBC declared he backs a Tobin tax.”
