= Transaction tax =

Transaction Tax may refer to:

- Financial transaction tax
- Automated Payment Transaction tax
