= Financial transaction tax =

Tax levied on trades of financial instruments such as stocks, bonds, or derivatives

A financial transaction tax (FTT) is a levy on a specific type of financial transaction for a particular purpose. The tax has been most commonly associated with the financial sector for transactions involving intangible property rather than real property. It is not usually considered to include consumption taxes paid by consumers.

A transaction tax is levied on specific transactions designated as taxable rather than on any other attributes of financial institutions. If an institution is never a party to a taxable transaction, then no transaction tax will be levied from it. If an institution carries out one such transaction, then it will be levied the tax for the one transaction. This tax is narrower in scope than a financial activities tax (FAT), and is not directly an industry or sector tax like a Financial stability contribution (FSC), or "bank tax", for example. These distinctions are important in discussions about the utility of financial transaction tax as a tool to selectively discourage excessive speculation without discouraging any other activity (as John Maynard Keynes originally envisioned it in 1936).

There are several types of financial transaction taxes. Each has its own purpose. Some have been implemented, while some are only proposals. Concepts are found in various organizations and regions around the world. Some are domestic and meant to be used within one nation; whereas some are multinational. In 2011 there were 40 countries that made use of FTT, together raising $38 billion (€29bn).

== History ==
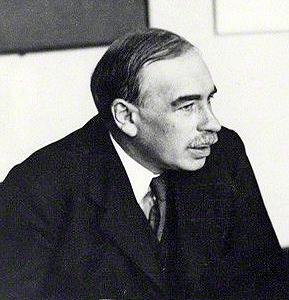
John Maynard Keynes (1933) envisaged the financial transaction tax in 1936.

The year 1694 saw an early implementation of a financial transaction tax in the form of a stamp duty at the London Stock Exchange. The tax was payable by the buyer of shares for the official stamp on the legal document needed to formalize the purchase. As of 2011, it is the oldest tax still in existence in Great Britain.

In 1893, the Japanese government introduced the exchange tax, which continued until 1999. In 1893, the tax rates were 0.06% for securities and commodities and 0.03% for bonds.

The United States instituted a transfer tax on all sales or transfers of stock in The Revenue Act of 1914 (Act of 22 October 1914 (ch. 331, 38 Stat. 745)). Instead of a fixed tax amount per transaction, the tax was in the amount of 0.2% of the transaction value (20 basis points, bips). This was doubled to 0.4% (40 bips) in 1932, in the context of the Great Depression, then eliminated in 1966.

In 1936, in the wake of the Great Depression, John Maynard Keynes advocated the wider use of financial transaction taxes. He proposed the levying of a small transaction tax on dealings on Wall Street, in the United States, where he argued excessive speculation by uninformed financial traders increased volatility (see Keynes financial transaction tax below).

In 1972 the Bretton Woods system for stabilizing currencies effectively came to an end. In that context, James Tobin, influenced by the work of Keynes, suggested his more specific currency transaction tax for stabilizing currencies on a larger global scale.

In 1989, at the Buenos Aires meetings of the International Institute of Public Finance, University of Wisconsin-Madison Professor of Economics Edgar L. Feige proposed extending the tax reform ideas of John Maynard Keynes, James Tobin and Lawrence Summers, to their logical conclusion, namely to tax all transactions. Feige's Automated Payment Transaction tax (APT tax) proposed taxing the broadest possible tax base at the lowest possible tax rate. Since financial transactions account for the greatest component of the APT tax base, and since all financial transactions are taxed, the proposal eliminates substitution possibilities for evasion and avoidance. The goal of the APT tax is to significantly improve economic efficiency, enhance stability in financial markets, and reduce to a minimum the costs of tax administration (assessment, collection, and compliance costs). The Automated Payment Transaction tax proposal was presented to the President's Advisory Panel on Federal Tax Reform in 2005.

As the EU, European free trade, and euro came together, various financial transaction taxes were considered openly. One non-tax regulatory equivalent of Tobin's narrow tax, to require "non-interest bearing deposit requirements on all open foreign exchange positions", was considered in particular but rejected. During the 1980s the Chicago School view became dominant, that speculation served a vital purpose in keeping currencies accurately reflecting the prospects of their economies, and that even very short term transactions in response to news could in fact reflect fundamental analysis.

Economic literature of the period the 1990s–2000s emphasized that derivatives and other variations in the terms of payment in trade-related transactions (so-called "swaps" for instance) provided a ready means of evading any tax other than the Automated Payment Transaction tax since it uniformly taxed all transactions. Other measures and exemptions from such transaction taxes, to avoid punishing hedging (a form of insurance for cashflows) were also proposed. These tended to lead to generally more complex schemes that were not implemented, in part due to lack of standardization of risk reporting under the Basel I framework, which was itself a response to the 1980s financial speculation crises.

However, disclosure had not kept pace with practices. Regulators and policy-makers and theorists by the 1990s had to deal with increasingly complex financial engineering and the "avoidance by a change of product mix... market participants would have an incentive to substitute out of financial instruments subject to the tax and into instruments not subject to it. In this fashion, markets would innovate to avoid the tax" as they were doing with the creation of financial derivatives. "The real issue is how to design a tax that takes account of all the methods and margins of substitution that investors have for changing their patterns of activity to avoid the tax. [as] suggested by Pollin et al. (1999)." – Palley, 2000 The global adoption of a small flat rate Automated Payment Transaction tax whose base included all transactions would eliminate evasion and avoidance possibilities since the tax would apply equally at all substitution margins. Advocates including Pollin, Palley, and Baker (2000) emphasized that transaction taxes "have clearly not prevented the efficient functioning of" financial markets in the 20th century.

Many theorists raised the issue that hedging and speculation were more of a spectrum than a distinct duality of goals. "Academic studies (e.g. Bodnar et al, 1998) show that companies usually incorporate predictions of future price levels (i.e. a 'view') when executing hedges (a fact which will come as no surprise to most risk management practitioners). If hedging is really just about reducing risk, then why should our expectations of future market direction have any bearing on our hedging decisions? If we hedge 50% of our exposure, instead of 80% or 100%, because we feel that the price/rate of the underlying exposure is more likely to move in our favor, does this meet the criteria for speculation?... On one level (at the extremes), there is no doubt that hedging and speculation are very different activities. However, once you move beyond the straightforward elimination of open positions, into more nuanced transactions involving complex hedging strategies or tenuous relationships between hedges and exposures, the distinction between a hedge and a bet becomes increasingly vague."

To avoid this problem, most proposals emphasized taxing clearly speculative high-volume very-short-term (seconds to hours) transactions that could not in general reflect any change of fundamental exposure or cashflow expectation. Some of these emphasized the automated nature of the trade. FTT proposals often emerge in response to specific crises. For example, the December 1994 Mexican peso crisis reduced confidence in its currency. In that context, Paul Bernd Spahn re-examined the Tobin tax, opposed its original form, and instead proposed his own version in 1995.

In the context of the 2008 financial crisis, many economists, governments, and organizations around the world re-examined or were asked to re-examine, the concept of a financial transaction tax, or its various forms. As a result, various new forms of financial transaction taxes were proposed, such as the EU financial transaction tax. The outcry after this crisis had major political, legal, and economic fallout. By the 2010s the Basel II and Basel III frameworks required reporting that would help to differentiate investing from speculation. Economic thought was tending to reject the belief that they could not be differentiated, or (as the "Chicago School" had held) should not be. However, even Basel III did not require detailed enough disclosure of risk to enable a clear differentiation of hedging vs. speculation.

As another example of an FTT proposal as a warning to speculators, or a response to the crisis, in March 2016 China drafted rules to impose a genuine currency transaction tax and this was referred to in the financial press as a Tobin tax . This was widely viewed as a warning to curb shorting of its currency the yuan. It was however expected to keep this tax at 0% initially, calculating potential revenue from different rate schemes and exemptions, and not to impose the actual tax unless speculation increased.

Also in 2016 US Democratic Party presidential nominee Hillary Clinton asserted that speculation had "placed stress on our markets, created instability, and enabled unfair and abusive trading strategies" and that as President she would seek to "impose a tax on harmful high-frequency trading and reform rules to make our stock markets fairer, more open, and transparent.". However, the term "high-frequency" implied that only a few large volume transaction players engaged in arbitrage would likely be affected. In this respect, Clinton was following the general 1990s trend to focus on automated transactions, in particular, those which could not reflect any genuine human-reviewed fundamental risk or hedge analysis.

She also vowed to "Impose a risk fee on the largest financial institutions. Big banks and financial companies would be required to pay a fee based on their size and their risk of contributing to another crisis." How much fees would be assessed, and whether they amounted to a tax, were an active topic of speculation in the financial community, which expected them to follow Basel III definitions with further refinements.

== Purpose ==
Although every financial transaction tax (FTT) proposal has its own specific intended purpose, some general intended purposes are common to most of them. Below are some of those general commonalities. The intended purpose may or may not be achieved.

=== Curbing volatility of financial markets ===
In 1936, when Keynes first proposed a financial transaction tax, he wrote, "Speculators may not harm bubbles on a steady stream of enterprise. But the situation is serious when enterprise becomes the bubble on a whirlpool of speculation." Rescuing enterprise from becoming "the bubble on a whirlpool of speculation" was also an intended purpose of the 1972 Tobin tax and is a common theme in several other types of financial transaction taxes. For the specific type of volatility in specific areas, see each specific type of financial transaction taxes below. An exception to the purpose of "curbing of volatility" is likely the "bank transaction tax".

=== Curbing speculation without discouraging hedging ===
The role of large numbers of individual speculators willing to take both short and long positions without prejudice does play some role in preventing price bubbles and asset inflation. However, excess speculation is often deemed not only a source of volatility but a distraction of talent and a dangerous shift of focus for a developed economy. By contrast, hedging is necessary for the stability of enterprises. Tax schemes, in general, seek to tax speculation – seen as akin to gambling – while trying not to interfere with hedging (a form of insurance). The differences summarize that:

- hedging protects an existing investment against unforeseen price changes, while speculation takes on the additional risk the investor could have avoided
- hedging is a means to manage or limit price risk, while speculation actually relies on taking a risk for profit (and is in this respect similar to gambling)
- hedging protects against price changes and makes them less relevant to the overall price of outputs sold to the public, while speculation incurs risk to make a profit specifically from price volatility
- hedging is a form of insurance for risk-averse investors, speculation is for those seeking more rapid returns through higher risk

It can be difficult to draw a clear distinction between hedging activities and speculation "if the actual exposure cannot be clearly ascertained, then differentiating between a hedging transaction and a speculative trade can become very complicated; if the impact of the underlying exposure is opaque, then the risk-reducing impact of the hedge becomes obscured (if it ever existed)...once you move beyond the straightforward elimination of open positions, into more nuanced transactions involving complex hedging strategies or tenuous relationships between hedges and exposures, the distinction between a hedge and a bet becomes increasingly vague". In general the advocates of financial transaction tax point to Basel III and other treaties and regulations that have increasingly required disclosure to make it easier to ascertain the degree of hedging or speculation in a given transaction or set of transactions.

The sheer duration of a holding is the most cogent clue: Day traders all engage in speculation by definition.

=== More fair and equitable tax collection ===
Another common theme is the proposed intention to create a system of more fair and equitable tax collection. The Automated Payment Transaction tax (APT tax) taxes the broadest possible tax base, namely all transactions including all real and financial asset transactions. Instead of introducing progressivity through the tax rate structure, the flat rate APT tax introduces progressiveness through the tax base since the highest income and wealth groups undertake a disproportionate share of financial transactions. In the context of the 2008 financial crisis, many economists, governments, and organizations around the world re-examined, or were asked to re-examine, the concept of a financial transaction tax, or its various forms. In response to a request from the G20 nations, the International Monetary Fund (IMF) delivered a report in 2010 titled "A Fair and Substantial Contribution by the Financial Sector" which made reference to a financial transaction tax as one of several options.

According to several leading figures, the "fairness" aspect of a financial transaction tax has eclipsed, and/or replaced, "prevention of volatility" as the most important purpose for the tax. Fraser Reilly-King of Halifax Initiative is one such economist. He proposes that an FTT would not have addressed the root causes of the United States housing bubble which, in part, triggered the 2008 financial crisis. Nevertheless, he sees an FTT as important for bringing a more equitable balance to the taxation of all parts of the economy.

=== Less susceptible to tax evasion than alternatives ===
According to some economists, a financial transaction tax is less susceptible to tax avoidance and tax evasion than other types of taxes proposed for the financial sector. The Automated Payment Transaction tax (APT tax) employs 21st century technology for automatically assessing and collecting taxes when transactions are settled through the electronic technology of the banking payments system. Joseph Stiglitz, former Senior Vice President and Chief Economist of the World Bank affirmed the "technical feasibility" of the tax. Although Tobin said his tax idea was unfeasible in practice, Stiglitz noted that modern technology meant that was no longer the case and said that the tax is "much more feasible today" than a few decades ago, when Tobin disagreed. Fraser Reilly-King of Halifax Initiative also points out that the key issue and advantage of an FTT is its relatively superior functional ability to prevent tax evasion in the financial sector. Economist Rodney Schmidt, principal researcher of The North-South Institute, also concurred that a financial transaction tax is more technically feasible than the "bank tax" proposed by the IMF in 2010.

== Types ==
Transaction taxes can be raised on the sale of specific financial assets, such as stock, bonds, or futures; they can be applied to currency exchange transactions, or they can be general taxes levied against a mix of different transactions.

=== Securities transaction tax ===
John Maynard Keynes was among the first proponents of a securities transaction tax. In 1936 he proposed that a small tax should be levied on dealings on Wall Street, in the United States, where he argued that excessive speculation by uninformed financial traders increased volatility. For Keynes, the key issue was the proportion of 'speculators' in the market, and his concern that, if left unchecked, these types of players would become too dominant. Keynes writes: "The introduction of a substantial Government transfer tax on all transactions might prove the most serviceable reform available, to mitigate the predominance of speculation over enterprise in the United States. (1936:159–60)"

=== Currency transaction tax ===
A currency transaction tax is a tax placed on a specific type of currency transaction for a specific purpose. This term has been most commonly associated with the financial sector, as opposed to consumption taxes paid by consumers. The most frequently discussed versions of a currency transaction tax are the Tobin tax, Edgar L. Feige's Automated Payment Transaction tax and Spahn tax. The Automated Payment Transaction tax requires that all transactions be taxed regardless of the means of payment. As such, it proposes a unique tax on currency transactions collected at the time currency leaves or enters the banking system. Since each transaction mediated by currency can not be directly taxed, the APT tax proposes a brokerage fee on currency deposits and withdrawals that is some multiple of the flat transaction tax rate applied to all payments made via electronic payments mechanisms.

Tobin tax

In 1972 the economist James Tobin proposed a tax on all spot conversions of one currency into another. The so-called Tobin tax is intended to put a penalty on short-term financial round-trip excursions into another currency. Tobin suggested his currency transaction tax in 1972 in his Janeway Lectures at Princeton, shortly after the Bretton Woods system effectively ended. In 2001, James Tobin looked back at the 1994 Mexican peso crisis, the 1997 Asian financial crisis, and the 1998 Russian financial crisis, and said: "[My proposed] tax [idea] on foreign exchange transactions... dissuades speculators as many investors invest their money in foreign exchange on a very short-term basis. If this money is suddenly withdrawn, countries have to drastically increase interest rates for their currency to still be attractive. But high interest is often disastrous for a national economy, as the nineties' crises in Mexico, South East Asia and Russia have proven...."

It is intended to put a penalty on short-term financial round-trip excursions into another currency

Spahn tax

Paul Bernd Spahn opposed the original form of a Tobin Tax in a Working Paper International Financial Flows and Transactions Taxes: Survey and Options, concluding "...the original Tobin tax is not viable. First, it is virtually impossible to distinguish between normal liquidity trading and speculative noise trading. If the tax is generally applied at high rates, it will severely impair financial operations and create international liquidity problems, especially if derivatives are taxed as well." However, on 16 June 1995 Spahn suggested that "Most of the difficulties of the Tobin tax could be resolved, possibly with a two-tier rate structure consisting of a low-rate financial transactions tax and an exchange surcharge at prohibitive rates." This new form of tax, the Spahn tax, was later approved by the Belgian Federal Parliament in 2004.

It has a two-tier rate structure consisting of a low rate financial transactions tax and an exchange surcharge at prohibitive rates.

Special Drawing Rights

On 19 September 2001, retired speculator George Soros put forward a proposal, issuing special drawing rights (SDR) that the rich countries would pledge for providing international assistance and the alleviation of poverty and other objectives. According to Soros this could make a substantial amount of money available almost immediately. In 1997, IMF member governments agreed to a one-time special allocation of SDRs, totaling approximately $27.5 billion. This is slightly less than 0.1% of the global GDP. Members having 71% of the total vote needed for implementation have already ratified the decision. All it needs is the approval of the United States Congress. If the scheme is successfully tested, it could be followed by an annual issue of SDRs and the amounts could be scaled up "so that they could have a meaningful impact on many of our most pressing social issues".

=== Bank transaction tax ===
Between 1982 and 2002 Australia charged a bank account debits tax on customer withdrawals from bank accounts with a cheque facility. Some Latin American countries also experimented with taxes levied on bank transactions. Argentina introduced a bank transaction tax in 1984 before it was abolished in 1992. Brazil implemented its temporary "CPMF" in 1993, which lasted until 2007. The broad-based tax levied on all debit (and/or credit) entries on bank accounts proved to be evasion-proof, more efficient, and less costly than orthodox tax models.

It often applies to deposits and withdrawals from bank accounts, often including checking accounts.

=== Automated Payment Transaction Tax ===
In 1989, Edgar L. Feige proposed the synthesis and extension of the ideas of Keynes and Tobin by proposing a flat-rate tax on all transactions. The total volume of all transactions undertaken in an economy represents the broadest possible tax base and therefore requires the lowest flat tax rate to raise any required amount of revenue. Since financial transactions in stocks, bonds, international currency transactions, and derivatives comprise most of the Automated Payment Transaction (APT) tax base, it is in essence the broadest of financial transaction taxes. Initially proposed as a revenue-neutral replacement for the entire federal tax system of the United States, it could alternatively be considered as a global tax whose revenues could be used by national governments to reduce existing income, corporate and VAT tax rates as well as reducing existing sovereign debt burdens. If adopted by all of the developed nations, it would have the advantage of eliminating all incentives for substitution between financial assets and between financial centers since all transactions would universally be taxed at the identical flat tax rate.

The foundations of the APT tax proposal—a small, uniform tax on all economic transactions—involve simplification, base broadening, reductions in marginal tax rates, the elimination of tax and information returns, and the automatic collection of tax revenues at the payment source.

== Implemented financial transaction taxes ==
In 2011 there were 40 countries that had FTT in operation, raising $38 billion (€29bn).

=== Belgium ===
The Belgium securities tax applies to certain transactions concluded or executed in Belgium through a professional intermediary, to the extent that they relate to public funds, irrespective of their (Belgian or foreign) origin. The "tax on stock exchange transactions" is not due upon subscription of new securities (primary market transactions). Both buyers and sellers are subject to tax. The tax rate varies following the type of transactions. A 0.09% tax (subject to a maximum of €1,300 per transaction) is charged for distributing shares of investment companies, certificates of contractual investment funds, bonds of the Belgian public debt or the public debt of foreign states, nominative or bearer bonds, certificates of bonds, etc. A 1.32% tax (subject to a maximum of €4,000 per transaction) is charged for accumulating shares of investment companies and 0.27% (subject to a maximum of €1,600 per transaction) for any other securities (such as shares). Transactions made for its own account by non-resident taxpayers and by some financial institutions, such as banks, insurance companies, organizations for financing pensions (OFPs), or collective investment are exempted from the tax.

=== Colombia ===
In 1998 Colombia introduced a financial transaction tax of 0.2%,, raised to 0.4% in 2003, covering all financial transactions including banknotes, promissory notes, processing of payments by way of telegraphic transfer, EFTPOS, internet banking or other means, bank drafts and bank cheques, money on term deposit, overdrafts, installment loans, documentary and standby letters of credit, guarantees, performance bonds, securities underwriting commitments and other forms of off balance sheet exposures, safekeeping of documents and other items in safe deposit boxes, currency exchange, sale, distribution or brokerage, with or without advice, unit trusts and similar financial products.

=== Finland ===
Finland imposes a tax of 1.6% on the transfer of certain Finnish securities, mainly equities such as bonds, debt securities, and derivatives. The tax is charged if the transferee and/or transferor is a Finnish resident or a Finnish branch of certain financial institutions. However, there are several exceptions. For E.g. no transfer tax is payable if the equities in question are subject to trading on a qualifying market. Prime Minister Jyrki Katainen (National Coalition Party) decided that Finland will not join a group of eleven other European Union states that have signed up to be at the forefront of preparing a financial transaction tax in November 2012. Other government parties the Green League, the Social Democratic Party of Finland and the Left Alliance had supporters of the tax. Supporters of the tax are Austria, Belgium, France, Germany, Greece, Italy, Portugal, Slovakia, Slovenia and Spain and likely Estonia. For example, British banks opposed the tax. Supporters said: "We are delighted that the European FTT is moving from rhetoric to reality and will ensure banks pay for the damage they have caused; This shows it is possible to put the needs of the public over the profits of a privileged few. It's unforgivable in this age of austerity that the UK government is turning down billions in additional revenue to protect the City's elite."

=== France ===
On 1 August 2012, France introduced a financial transaction tax in French tax regulation pursuant to Article 5 of the French Amended Finance Bill of 14 March 2012. Two other taxes applicable to financial transactions were also introduced, including a tax on high-frequency trading, (Article 235 ter ZD bis of the FTC); and a tax on naked sovereign credit default swaps (Article 235 ter ZD ter of the FTC). The FTT levies a 0.2% tax on stock purchases of French publicly traded companies with a market value over €1 billion. The scheme does not include debt securities, except convertible and exchangeable bonds, which are included but benefit from a dedicated exemption to the FTT. According to French president Francois Hollande the tax will generate €170 million in additional revenue for 2012 and another €500 million in 2013. France is the first European country to impose a transaction tax on share purchases. From 2 January 2017 settlement date the rate increased to 0.3%. As of 1 April 2025 the rate increased to 0.4%.

=== Greece ===
Listed shares acquired as of 1 January 2013 will no longer be subject to the sales tax; rather, any capital gains received will be added to the taxpayer's total income. Capital gains taxes such as Greece's are generally not considered financial transaction taxes.

=== India ===
Since 1 October 2004, India levies a Securities Transaction Tax (STT). As of 2020, the rate on buy and sell transactions made through a recognized national stock exchange is 0.1% paid by the seller plus 0.1% paid by the buyer. Other rates apply to derivatives transactions; for example, for sale of options on securities, the rate is 0.017% of the option premium. The tax has been criticized by the Indian financial sector and is currently under review.

=== Italy ===
Since 1 March 2013, Italy levies financial transaction tax on qualified equity transactions of up to 0.2% (0.22% in 2013) of the value of the trade. Financial transaction tax on derivatives of qualified equity transactions went into effect on 1 September 2013. The regulation is to apply the tax on the net balance of purchase and sale transactions executed same day on the same financial instrument by the same person/entity.

It applies to:

- Shares issued by Italian resident companies with a capitalization equal to or higher than 500 million euros;
- Cash equity contracts;
- Equity Derivatives contracts;
- Instruments incorporating or representing the shares (ADR, GDR) regardless the residency of the issuer;
- High Frequency Trading on cash equities and equity derivatives transactions. The liable party is the investor (net buyer) for cash equities and both parties of the derivatives contract.

=== Japan ===
Until 1999, Japan imposed a transaction tax on a variety of financial instruments, including debt instruments and equity instruments, but at differential rates. The tax rates were higher on equities than on debentures and bonds. In the late 1980s, the Japanese government was generating significant revenues of about $12 billion per year. The tax was eventually withdrawn as part of the "big bang" liberalization of the financial sector in 1999.

There were these taxes.

- exchange tax (1893-1999)
- securities transfer tax (1937-1950)
- securities transaction tax (1953-1999)

In 1893, the tax rates were 0.06% for securities and commodities and 0.03% for bonds.

=== Peru ===
In 2003 the Peruvian government introduced a 0.1% general financial transaction tax on all foreign currency-denominated incoming wire transfers regardless of their country of origin, to raise finance for the education sector. The tax is to be assessed automatically but collected manually.

=== Poland ===
Poland charges a 1% Civil Law Activities Tax (CLAT) on the sale or exchange of property rights, which includes securities and derivatives. The tax applies to transactions, which are performed in Poland or which grant property rights that are to be exercised in Poland. It also applies to transactions executed outside Poland if the buyer is established in Poland. All transactions on a stock market, Polish treasury bonds and Polish treasury bills, bills issued by the National Bank, and some other specified securities are exempted from the tax.

=== Singapore ===
Singapore charges a 0.2% stamp duty on all instruments that give effect to transactions in stocks and shares. However, this duty only applies to actual physical documents, and is not levied on computerized transactions performed through securities accounts. Stamp duty is not levied on derivative instruments.

=== Spain ===
The Spanish Financial Transaction Tax (FTT) was approved in October 2020 (entering into force in January 2021), allowing Spain to tax the acquisition of listed shares issued by Spanish companies admitted to trading on a Spanish or other EU-regulated markets, or on a non-EU equivalent market, with a market capitalization exceeding EUR 1 billion on December 1 of the previous year. This policy is in line with the trend initiated previously by other countries and EU partners such as France or Italy.

This indirect tax follows the "principle of issue" rather than the one of residence, applying to any acquisition of shares in Spanish companies regardless of the parties' tax residences or the location of the transaction, thus broadening the scope of application, which implications will have to be analyzed. The mode and venue of the transaction are also indifferent; if it meets the conditions, it will be subject to FTT. However, some exemptions are contemplated like acquisitions carried out on the primary market or acquisitions required for the market's effective operation, such as those required by Regulation (EU) 596/2014 on Market Abuse, among others.

The SFTT tax rate is fixed at 0.2 percent. The tax base is the total amount of taxed transactions, excluding transaction costs resulting from market infrastructure pricing, intermediation trading fees, and all other costs associated with the transaction. The taxpayer will generally be the purchaser of the shares, although some provisions are given regarding which entity is responsible for filing the tax return. Those investment services firms or credit institutions buying shares on their own account are taxable individuals, whereas the financial intermediaries involved in the transaction are substitute taxpayers. Finally, the tax period is monthly, and the tax system is self-assessed, not permitting any deferral or installment payment.

=== Sweden ===
In January 1984, Sweden introduced a 0.5% tax on the purchase or sale of an equity security. Hence a round trip (purchase and sale) transaction resulted in a 1% tax. In July 1986, the rate was doubled, and in January 1989, a considerably lower tax of 0.002% on fixed-income securities was introduced for a security with a maturity of 90 days or less. On a bond with a maturity of five years or more, the tax was 0.003%. Analyst Marion G. Wrobel prepared a paper for the Canadian Government in June 1996, examining the international experience with financial transaction taxes, and paying particular attention to the Swedish experience.

The revenues from taxes were disappointing; for example, revenues from the tax on fixed-income securities were initially expected to amount to 1,500 million Swedish kronor per year. They did not amount to more than 80 million Swedish kronor in any year and the average was closer to 50 million. In addition, as taxable trading volumes fell, so did revenues from capital gains taxes, entirely offsetting revenues from the equity transactions tax that had grown to 4,000 million Swedish kronor by 1988.

On the day that the tax was announced, share prices fell by 2.2%. But there was leakage of information before the announcement, which might explain the 5.35% price decline in the 30 days before the announcement. When the tax was doubled, prices again fell by another 1%. These declines were in line with the capitalized value of future tax payments resulting from expected trades. It was further felt that the taxes on fixed-income securities only served to increase the cost of government borrowing, providing another argument against the tax.

Even though the tax on fixed-income securities was much lower than that on equities, the impact on market trading was much more dramatic. During the first week of the tax, the volume of bond trading fell by 85%, even though the tax rate on five-year bonds was only 0.003%. The volume of futures trading fell by 98% and the options trading market disappeared. On 15 April 1990, the tax on fixed-income securities was abolished. In January 1991 the rates on the remaining taxes were cut in half and by the end of the year, they were abolished completely. Once the taxes were eliminated, trading volumes returned and grew substantially in the 1990s. According to Anders Borg who served as finance minister in the Swedish government from 2006 to 2014, "between 90%-99% of traders in bonds, equities and derivatives moved out of Stockholm to London."

The Swedish FTT is widely considered a failure by design since traders could easily avoid the tax by using foreign broker services.

=== Switzerland ===
In Switzerland, a transfer tax (Umsatzabgabe) is levied on the transfer of domestic or foreign securities such as bonds and shares, where one of the parties or intermediaries is a Swiss security broker. Other securities such as options futures, etc. do not qualify as taxable securities. Swiss brokers include banks and bank-linked financial institutions. The duty is levied at a rate of 0.15% for domestic securities and 0.3% for foreign securities. However, there are numerous exemptions to the Swiss transfer tax. These are among others: Eurobonds, other bonds denominated in a foreign currency, and the trading stock of professional security brokers. The revenue of the Swiss transfer tax was CHF 1.9 billion in 2007 or 0.37% of GDP.

=== Taiwan ===
In Taiwan, the securities transaction tax (STT) is imposed upon the gross sales price of securities transferred and at a rate of 0.3% for share certificates issued by companies and 0.1% for corporate bonds or any securities offered to the public which have been duly approved by the government. However, trading of corporate bonds and financial bonds issued by Taiwanese issuers or companies are temporarily exempt from STT beginning 1 January 2010. The Taiwanese government argued this "would enliven the bond market and enhance the international competitiveness of Taiwan's enterprises."

Since 1998, Taiwan also levies a stock index futures transaction tax imposed on both parties. The current transaction tax is levied per transaction at a rate of not less than 0.01% and not more than 0.06%, based on the value of the futures contract. Revenue from the securities transaction tax and the futures transaction tax was about €2.4 billion in 2009. The major part of this revenue came from the taxation of bonds and stocks (96.5%). The taxation of stock index future shares was 3.5%. In total, this corresponds to 0.8% in terms of GDP.

=== United Kingdom ===
==== Stamp Duty ====
A stamp duty was introduced in the United Kingdom as an ad valorem tax on share purchases in 1808. Stamp duties are collected on documents used to effect the sale and transfer of certificated stock and other securities of UK based companies. It can be avoided using CFDs.

==== Stamp Duty Reserve Tax ====
To address the development of trades in uncertificated stock, the UK Finance Act 1986 introduced the Stamp Duty Reserve Tax (SDRT) at a rate of 0.5% on share purchases, raising around €3.8bn per year, of which 40% is paid by foreign residents. The tax is charged whether the transaction takes place in the UK or overseas, and whether either party is a resident of the UK or not. Securities issued by companies overseas are not taxed. This means that—just like the standard stamp duty—the tax is paid by foreign and UK-based investors who invest in UK incorporated companies. In other words, the tax applies to all companies which are headquartered in the UK, albeit there is a relief for intermediaries (such as market makers and large banks that are members of a qualifying exchange) as a condition of their obligation to provide liquidity.

Both stamp duty and SDRT remain in place today, albeit with continued relief for intermediaries, so that about 63% of transactions are exempt from tax. SDRT accounts for the majority of revenue collected on share transactions effected through the UK's Exchanges. On average almost 90% of revenues stem from the SDRT. Only a minor part comes from Stamp Duty. Revenue is pro-cyclical with economic activity. In terms of GDP and total tax revenue, the highest values were reached during the dot.com boom years around the end of the 20th century, notably in 2000–01. In 2007–08, SDRT generated €5.37 billion in revenue (compared to 0.72 billion of the standard stamp duty). This accounts for 0.82% over total UK tax revenue or 0.30% of GDP. In 2008–09 the figure dropped to €3.67 billion (0.22% of GDP), due to reduced share prices and trading volumes as a result of the 2008 financial crisis.

=== United States ===
The US imposed a financial transaction tax from 1914 to 1966. It was originally 0.2% and was doubled during the Great Depression.

The US imposes a "Section 31 fee", used to support the operation costs of the United States Securities and Exchange Commission, currently $20.60 per million dollars of sale proceeds for sales of stocks and ETFs (no fee for purchases) and $0.0042 round-trip on security futures transactions.

==== New York ====
Both New York State and New York City had a financial transaction tax, which lasted from 1905 to 1981. A study conducted by Anna Pomeranets, an economist at the Bank of Canada, and Daniel Weaver, a professor of economics at Rutgers University, found that it increased capital costs for enterprises, lowered stock prices, caused stocks to increase in volatility, and increased bid-ask spreads.

== Proposed financial transaction taxes ==
=== Global Tobin tax ===
In 2000 a "pro–Tobin tax" NGO proposed that a tax could be used to fund international development: "In the face of increasing income disparity and social inequity, the Tobin Tax represents a rare opportunity to capture the enormous wealth of an untaxed sector and redirect it towards the public good. Conservative estimates show the tax could yield from $150–300 billion annually." According to Dr. Stephen Spratt, "the revenues raised could be used for ... international development objectives ... such as meeting the Millennium Development Goals."

Revenue estimate for global currency transaction tax
| Tax base | Tax rate | Revenue estimate (US$ billion) |
|---|---|---|
| USD spot, forward and swap | .005% | 28.4 |
| GBP spot, forward and swap | .005% | 12.3 |
| EUR spot, forward and swap | .005% | 5.6 |
| JPY spot, forward and swap | .005% | 5 |
| Global total | .005% | 33.4 |

At the UN World Conference against Racism 2001, when the issue of compensation for colonialism and slavery arose in the agenda, President Fidel Castro of Cuba advocated the Tobin Tax to address that issue. According to Cliff Kincaid, Castro advocated it "specifically to generate U.S. financial reparations to the rest of the world", however a closer reading of Castro's speech shows that he never did mention "the rest of the world" as being recipients of revenue. Castro cited holocaust reparations as a previously established precedent for the concept of reparations. Castro also suggested that the United Nations be the administrator of this tax, stating the following:

May the tax suggested by Nobel Prize Laureate James Tobin be imposed in a reasonable and effective way on the current speculative operations accounting for trillions of US dollars every 24 hours, then the United Nations, which cannot go on depending on meager, inadequate, and belated donations and charities, will have one trillion US dollars annually to save and develop the world. Given the seriousness and urgency of the existing problems, which have become a real hazard for the very survival of our species on the planet, that is what would actually be needed before it is too late.

Member countries have not given the UN a mandate to seek a global financial tax.

=== Robin Hood tax ===
On 15 February 2010 a coalition of 50 charities and civil society organisations launched a campaign for a Robin Hood tax on global financial transactions. The proposal would affect a wide range of asset classes including the purchase and sale of stocks, bonds, commodities, unit trusts, mutual funds, and derivatives such as futures and options.

=== G20 financial transactions tax ===
Revenue estimate for US financial transaction tax
| Tax base | Tax rate | Revenue estimate (US$ billion) |
|---|---|---|
| US stocks/equities | .5% | 108–217 |
| US bonds | .02% | 26–52 |
| US forex spot | .01% | 8–16 |
| US futures | .02% | 7–14 |
| US options | .5% | 4–8 |
| US swaps | .015% | 23–46 |
| US total | | 177–354 |

A G20 financial transaction tax (G20 FTT) was first proposed in 2008. A G20 proposal for a FTT to raise revenue to reduce global poverty and spur global economic growth failed to gain support at the 2011 G-20 Cannes summit. Nevertheless, French President Nicolas Sarkozy said he planned to still pursue the idea. According to Bill Gates, co-founder of Microsoft and a supporter of a G20 FTT, even a small tax of 10 basis points on equities and 2 basis points on bonds could generate about $48 billion from G20 member states or $9 billion if only adopted by larger European countries.

=== United States financial transaction tax ===
Different US financial transaction tax (US FTT) bills have been proposed in Congress since 2009. In that year, Nancy Pelosi, the speaker of the United States House of Representatives, as well as other Democratic members of Congress, endorsed a global (G20-wide) FTT, with the revenue raised in the U.S. to be directed to infrastructure, deficit reduction, and job creation. This proposal failed to win the support of the Obama administration, with Treasury Secretaries Timothy Geithner and Jacob Lew, as well as Larry Summers, opposing the idea. The Obama administration instead proposed a Financial Crisis Responsibility Fee.

The main differences between various FTT proposals in Congress has been the size of the tax, which financial transactions are taxed and how the new tax revenue is spent. The bills have proposed a .025%–.5% tax on stocks, .025%–.1% tax on bonds and .005%–.02% on derivatives with the funds going to health, public services, debt reduction, infrastructure and job creation. The House of Representatives has introduced since 2009 ten different US FTT related bills and the Senate has introduced four. The bills in the Senate have been variously sponsored by Tom Harkin (D-Iowa) or Bernie Sanders (I-Vermont). The bills in the House have been variously sponsored by Peter DeFazio (D-Oregon), John Conyers (D-Michigan) or a number of other Representatives.

The US FTT bills proposed by Rep. Peter DeFazio (D-Oregon) and Sen. Harkin (D-Iowa) have received a number of cosponsors in the Senate and House. The Let Wall Street Pay for the Restoration of Main Street Bill is an early version of their cosponsored US FTT bill which includes a tax on US financial market securities transactions. The bill suggests to tax stock transactions at a rate of 0.25%. The tax on futures contracts to buy or sell a specified commodity of standardized quality at a certain date in the future, at a market determined price would be 0.02%. Swaps between two firms and credit default swaps would be taxed 0.02%. The tax would only target speculators, since the tax would be refunded to average investors, pension funds and health savings accounts. Projected annual revenue is $150 billion per year, half of which would go towards deficit reduction and half of which would go towards job promotion activities. The day the bill was introduced, it had the support of 25 of DeFazio's House colleagues.

=== European Union financial transaction tax ===
EU Financial transaction tax Supporting EU countries Opposing EU countries Undecided euro countries Undecided non-euro countries

The EU financial transaction tax (EU FTT) is a proposal made by the European Commission in September 2011 to introduce a financial transaction tax within the 27 member states of the European Union by 2014. The tax would only impact financial transactions between financial institutions charging 0.1% against the exchange of shares and bonds and 0.01% across derivative contracts. According to the European Commission it could raise €57 billion every year, of which around €10bn (£8.4bn) would go to Great Britain, which hosts Europe's biggest financial center. It is unclear whether a financial transaction tax is compatible with European law.

If implemented the tax must be paid in the European country where the financial operator is established. This "R plus I" (residence plus issuance) solution means the EU-FTT would cover all transactions that involve a single European firm, no matter if these transactions are carried out in the EU or elsewhere in the world. The scheme makes it impossible for say French or German banks to avoid the tax by moving their transactions offshore, unless they give up all their European customers.

According to John Dizard of the Financial Times, the unilateral extension of extraterritorial power can only cause problems:-

From a US perspective, this unilateral extension of extraterritorial power by the commission goes beyond anything attempted since the US and Great Britain concluded the Treaty of Paris ending the Revolutionary War in 1783. Most institutions that try to do something like that have their own navy, and usually a larger one than the sovereign territory where they are attempting to impose the tax.

Being faced with stiff resistance from some non-eurozone EU countries, particularly United Kingdom and Sweden, a group of eleven states began pursuing the idea of utilizing enhanced co-operation to implement the tax in states which wish to participate. Opinion polls indicate that two-thirds of British people are in favour of some forms of FTT (see section: Public opinion).

The proposal supported by the eleven EU member states, was approved in the European Parliament in December 2012, and by the Council of the European Union in January 2013. The formal agreement on the details of the EU FTT still need to be decided upon and approved by the European Parliament.

== Evaluation ==
=== Effect on volatility ===
Proponents of the tax assert that it will reduce price volatility. In a 1984 paper, Lawrence Summers and Victoria Summers argued, "Such a tax would have the beneficial effects of curbing instability introduced by speculation, reducing the diversion of resources into the financial sector of the economy, and lengthening the horizons of corporate managers." It is further believed that FTTs "should reduce volatility by reducing the number of noise traders". However most empirical studies find that the relationship between FTT and short-term price volatility is ambiguous and that "higher transaction costs are associated with more, rather than less, volatility".

A 2003 IMF Staff Paper by Karl Habermeier and Andrei Kirilenko found that FTTs are "positively related to increased volatility and lower volume". A study of the Shanghai and Shenzhen stock exchanges says the FTT created significant increases in volatility because it "would influence not only noise traders, but also those informed traders who play the role of decreasing volatility in the stock market." A French study of 6,774 daily realized volatility measurements for 4.7 million trades in a four-year period of index stocks trading in the Paris Bourse from 1995 to 1999 reached the same conclusion "that higher transaction costs increase stock return volatility". The French study concluded that these volatility measures "are likely to underestimate the destabilizing role of security transactions since they – unlike large ticks – also reduce the stabilizing liquidity supply".

A 1997 study of the UK Stamp Duty, which exempts market makers and large banks that are members of a qualifying exchange, found no significant effect on the volatility of UK equity prices.

=== Effect on liquidity ===
In 2011 the IMF published a study paper, which argues that a securities transaction tax (STT) "reduces trading volume, it may decrease liquidity or, equivalently, may increase the price impact of trades, which will tend to heighten price volatility". A study by the think tank Oxera found that the imposition of the UK's Stamp Duty would "likely have a negative effect on liquidity in secondary markets". Regarding proposals to abolish the UK's Stamp Duty, Oxera concluded that the abolition would "be likely to result in a non-negligible increase in liquidity, further reducing the cost of capital of UK listed companies". A study of the FTT in Chinese stock markets found liquidity reductions due to decreased transactions.

=== Effect on price discovery ===
An IMF Working Paper found a FTT impacts price discovery. The natural effect of the FTT's reduction of trading volume is to reduce liquidity, which "can in turn slow price discovery, the process by which financial markets incorporate the effect of new information into asset prices". The FTT would cause information to be incorporated more slowly into trades, creating "a greater autocorrelation of returns". This pattern could impede the ability of the market to prevent asset bubbles. The deterrence of transactions could "slow the upswing of the asset cycle", but it could also "slow a correction of prices toward their fundamental values".

Habermeier and Kirilenko conclude that "The presence of even very small transaction costs makes continuous rebalancing infinitely expensive. Therefore, valuable information can be held back from being incorporated into prices. As a result, prices can deviate from their full information values." A Chinese study agrees, saying: "When it happens that an asset's price is currently misleading and is inconsistent with its intrinsic value, it would take longer to correct for the discrepancy because of the lack of enough transactions. In these cases, the capital market becomes less efficient."

=== Revenues ===
Revenue Estimate for Global Financial Transaction Tax
| Tax base | Tax rate | Revenue estimate (US$ billion) |
|---|---|---|
| Global stocks | .01% | 6.6–7 |
| Global bonds | .01% | 1.4 |
| Global derivatives (exchange) | .01% | 110–147 |
| Global derivatives (OTC) | .01% | 83–111 |
| Global total | .01% | 202–266 |

Revenues vary according to tax rate, transactions covered, and tax effects on transactions. The Swedish experience with transaction taxes in 1984–91 demonstrates that the net effect on tax revenues can be difficult to estimate and can even be negative due to reduced trading volumes. Revenues from the transaction tax on fixed-income securities were initially expected to amount to 1,500 million Swedish kronor per year but actually amounted to no more than 80 million Swedish kronor in any year. Reduced trading volumes also caused a reduction in capital gains tax revenue which entirely offset the transaction tax revenues.

An examination of the scale and nature of the various payments and derivatives transactions and the likely elasticity of response led Honohan and Yoder (2010) to conclude that attempts to raise a significant percentage of gross domestic product in revenue from a broad-based financial transactions tax are likely to fail both by raising much less revenue than expected and by generating far-reaching changes in economic behavior. They point out that, although the side effects would include a sizable restructuring of financial sector activity, this would not occur in ways corrective of the particular forms of financial overtrading that were most conspicuous in contributing to the 2008 financial crisis. Accordingly, such taxes likely deliver both less revenue and less efficiency benefits than have sometimes been claimed by some. On the other hand, they observe that such taxes may be less damaging than feared by others.

On the other hand, the case of UK stamp duty reserve tax shows that provided exemptions are given to market makers and banks, that FTT can generate modest revenues, at the expense of pensioners and savers. Despite the tax rate of 0.5% on the purchase of shares, the UK managed to generate between €3.7 and €7.4 billion in revenues from stamp duties per year throughout the last decade. Also the cases of Japan, Taiwan and Switzerland suggest that countries may generate sizable amounts of income by introducing FTT on a national scale. If implemented on an international scale, revenues may be even considerably higher, since it would make it more difficult for traders to avoid the tax by moving to other locations.

Projections of FTT proposals

- Worldwide: According to the Robin Hood Tax campaign a FTT rate of about 0.05% on transactions like stocks, bonds, foreign currency and derivatives could raise £250 billion a year globally or £20 billion in the UK alone.
- United States: The Center for Economic and Policy Research estimates a US FTT to raise $177 billion per year.
- European Union: The European Commission expects its proposed EU financial transaction tax of 0.1% on bond and equity transactions, and 0.01% on derivative transactions between financial firms to raise up to €55 billion per year.

=== Effect on share prices ===
According to a European Commission working paper, empirical studies show that the UK stamp duty influences the share prices negatively. More frequently traded shares are stronger affected than low-turnover shares. Therefore, the tax revenue capitalizes at least to some extent in lower current share prices. For firms which rely on equity as marginal source of finance this may increase capital costs since the issue price of new shares would be lower than without the tax.

Kenneth Rogoff, Professor of Economics and Public Policy at Harvard University, and formerly Chief Economist at the IMF, argues that "Higher transactions taxes increase the cost of capital, ultimately lowering investment. With a lower capital stock, output would trend downward, reducing government revenues and substantially offsetting the direct gain from the tax. In the long run, wages would fall, and ordinary workers would end up bearing a significant share of the cost. More broadly, FTTs violate the general public-finance principle that it is inefficient to tax intermediate factors of production, particularly ones that are highly mobile and fluid in their response."

=== Progressive or regressive tax ===
An IMF Working Paper finds that the FTT "disproportionately burdens" the financial sector and will also impact pension funds, public corporations, international commerce firms, and the public sector, with "multiple layers of tax" creating a "cascading effect". "[E]ven an apparently low-rate [FTT] might result in a high tax burden on some activities." These costs could also be passed on to clients, including not only wealthy individuals and corporations, but charities and pension and mutual funds.

Other studies have suggested that the financial transaction tax is regressive in application—particularly the Stamp Duty in the UK, which includes certain exemptions only available to institutional investors. One UK study, by the Institute for Development Studies, suggests, "In the long run, a significant proportion of the tax could end up being passed on to consumers." Another study of the UK Stamp Duty found that institutional investors avoid the tax due to intermediary relief, while short-term investors who are willing to take on additional risk can avoid the tax by trading noncovered derivatives. The study concluded, therefore, "The tax is thus likely to fall most heavily on long-term, risk-averse investors."

=== Technical feasibility ===
Although James Tobin had said his own Tobin tax idea was unfeasible in practice, a study on its feasibility commissioned by the German government 2002 concluded that the tax was feasible even at a limited scale within the European time zone without significant tax evasion. Joseph Stiglitz, former Senior Vice President and Chief Economist of the World Bank, said, on 5 October 2009, that modern technology meant that was no longer the case. Stiglitz said, the tax is "much more feasible today" than a few decades ago, when Tobin recanted. However, on 7 November 2009, at the G20 finance ministers summit in Scotland, the head of the International Monetary Fund, Dominique Strauss-Khan, said, "transactions are very difficult to measure and so it's very easy to avoid a transaction tax." Nevertheless, in early December 2009, economist Stephany Griffith-Jones agreed that the "greater centralisation and automisation of the exchanges' and banks' clearing and settlements systems ... makes avoidance of payment more difficult and less desirable."

In January 2010, feasibility of the tax was supported and clarified by researcher Rodney Schmidt, who noted "it is technically easy to collect a financial tax from exchanges ... transactions taxes can be collected by the central counterparty at the point of the trade, or automatically in the clearing or settlement process." (All large-value financial transactions go through three steps. First dealers agree to a trade; then the dealers' banks match the two sides of the trade through an electronic central clearing system; and finally, the two individual financial instruments are transferred simultaneously to a central settlement system. Thus a tax can be collected at the few places where all trades are ultimately cleared or settled.)

When presented with the problem of speculators shifting operations to offshore tax havens, a representative of a "pro–Tobin tax" NGO argued as follows:

Agreement between nations could help avoid the relocation threat, particularly if the taxes were charged at the site where dealers or banks are physically located or at the sites where payments are settled or 'netted'. The relocation of Chase Manhattan Bank to an offshore site would be expensive, risky and highly unlikely – particularly to avoid a small tax. Globally, the move towards a centralized trading system means transactions are being tracked by fewer and fewer institutions. Hiding trades is becoming increasingly difficult. Transfers to tax havens like the Cayman Islands could be penalized at double the agreed rate or more. Citizens of participating countries would also be taxed regardless of where the transaction was carried out.

=== Gradual implementation feasibility ===
There has been debate as to whether one single nation could unilaterally implement a financial transaction tax. In the year 2000, "eighty per cent of foreign-exchange trading [took] place in just seven cities. Agreement [to implement the tax] by [just three cities,] London, New York and Tokyo alone, would capture 58 per cent of speculative trading." However, on 27 June 2010 at the 2010 G-20 Toronto summit, the G20 leaders declared that a "global tax" was no longer "on the table", but that individual countries will be able to decide whether to implement a levy against financial institutions to recoup billions of dollars in taxpayer-funded bailouts.

== Political support ==
Supporter (green) and opponents (red) of the EU financial transaction tax; undecided countries are in grey (date: March 2012). EU countries pro EU countries contra Undecided EU countries Udecided Non-euro countries

=== Supporting countries ===
- Argentina: In early November 2007, then Argentinian president Néstor Kirchner initiates and supports a regional Tobin tax. The proposal is supported by the Bank of the South.
- Austria: In August 2011, the Austrian government states its support for a FTT, including a European FTT, in case of lacking political support to implement it on a global scale.
- Belgium: On 15 June 2004, the Commission of Finance and Budget in the Belgian Federal Parliament approved a bill implementing a Spahn tax.
- Brazil: On 20 October 2009 the Government of Brazil officially supports a FTT.
- Cuba: President of Cuba, Fidel Castro advocated a global FTT at the UN September 2001 World Conference against Racism to be used as a compensation for colonialism and slavery.
- Estonia: In December 2011, Estonian prime minister Andrus Ansip said his country was prepared to support a FTT "if it increases the stability of the financial system and prevents competition distortions."
- Finland: The Finnish Government supports a FTT since 2000.
- France: In late 2001, the French National Assembly passed a Tobin tax amendment, which was overturned by the French Senate in March 2002. On 19 September 2009 the Government of France supports a FTT. On 5 February 2010 Christine Lagarde, then Minister of Economic Affairs, Industry and Employment of France supported a FTT. On 1 August 2012, French president Hollande introduced a unilateral 0.2 percent FTT.
- Germany: On 10 December 2009 the Chancellor of Germany Angela Merkel revises her position and now supports a FTT. On 20 May 2010, German officials were understood to favor a Financial Transaction Tax over a financial activities tax.
- Greece: Greece supports a FTT.
- Ireland: Ireland is in favor of EU-wide FTT, but not supporter of a Eurozone FTT.
- Italy: In January 2012, new Italian prime minister Mario Monti said Rome had changed tack and now backed the push for a financial transaction tax, but he also warned against countries going it alone.
- Luxembourg: In December 2011, prime minister of Luxembourg, Jean-Claude Juncker backed an EU-FTT, saying Europe can't refrain from "the justice that needs to be delivered" out of consideration for London's financial industry.
- Netherlands: In October 2011, Dutch prime minister Mark Rutte said his cabinet supports a FTT but opposes an introduction in only a few countries.
- Portugal: Portugal supports a FTT.
- South Africa: In October 2011, Finance Minister Pravin Gordhan strongly supports a FTT.
- Slovenia: Slovenia supports a FTT.
- Spain: Spain supports a FTT.
- Venezuela: The president of Venezuela, Hugo Chávez supports a FTT in 2001. In 2007 Chávez proposed a regional FTT for Latin America together with former Argentinian president Nestor Kirchner.

==== Other supporters ====
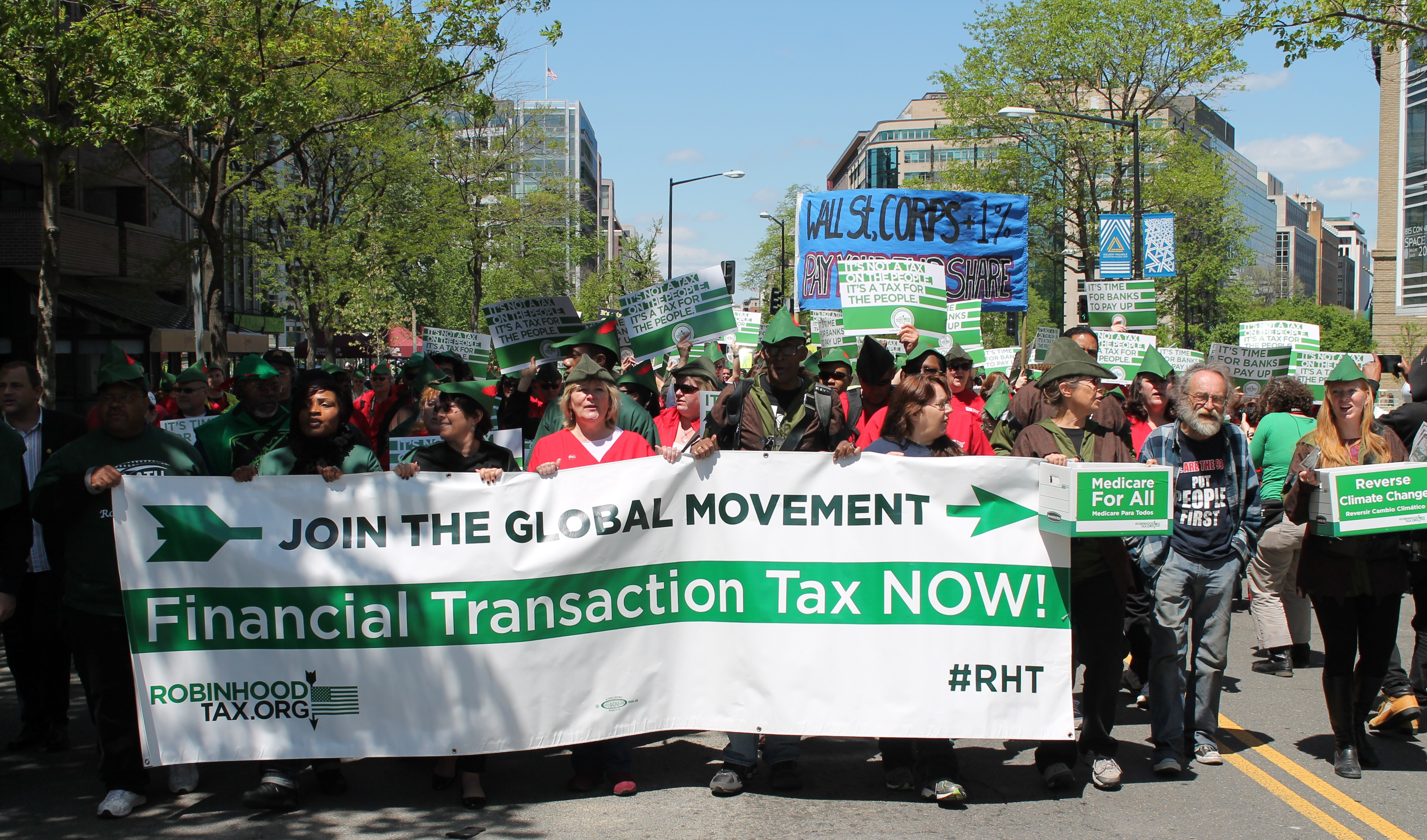
A Robin Hood Tax march in Washington, D.C. in 2013

Over 1,000 economists (including Nobel laureate Paul Krugman, Jeffrey Sachs and Nobel laureate Joseph Stiglitz), more than 1,000 parliamentarians from over 30 countries, the world's major labor leaders, the Association for the Taxation of Financial Transactions and for Citizens' Action, Occupy Wall Street protesters, Oxfam, War on Want and other major development groups, the World Wildlife Fund, Greenpeace and other major environmental organizations support a FTT. Other notable supporters include the Archbishop of Canterbury, Bill Gates and Michael Moore. David Harding, founder and CEO of one of London's biggest hedge funds has given qualified support for a European tax on financial transactions, breaking ranks with many of his peers fiercely opposed to such a measure. George Soros, put forward a different proposal, calling rich countries to donate their special drawing rights for the purpose of providing international assistance, without necessarily dismissing the Tobin tax idea. It has been widely reported that the Pope backs such a tax. However, the reality is that a commission of the Vatican of which the Pope is not a member merely said that such a tax would be worth reflecting on.

Another group of EU FTT supporters it is integrated by European federalists. In their opinion FTT would constitute, among other things, a fair political initiative in the 2008 financial crisis and it would represent an EU added value.

The European Commission has proposed a regional FTT to be implemented within the European Union (or the Eurozone) by 2014.

=== Opposing countries ===
- Canada: Paul Martin, Canadian Finance Minister opposes a FTT in 1994. On 23 March 1999 the House of Commons of Canada passed a resolution directing the government to "enact a tax on financial transactions in concert with the international community". However, in November 2009, at the G20 finance ministers summit, the representatives of the minority government of Canada spoke publicly on the world stage in opposition to the resolution. Canada's finance minister, Jim Flaherty, restated Canada's opposition to a Tobin tax, saying: "It is not something we would be interested in in Canada. We are not in the business of raising taxes, we are in the business of lowering taxes in Canada. It is not an idea we would look at."
- People's Republic of China: China opposes the tax because it may add more burdens on domestic banks.
- United Kingdom: The British government supports FTT only if implemented worldwide. In 2009, Adair Turner (chair) and Hector Sants (CEO) of the UK Financial Services Authority both supported the idea of new global taxes on financial transactions. On the other hand, the Bank of England strongly opposes a FTT. Its governor Mervyn King dismissed the idea of a "Tobin tax" on 26 January 2010, saying: "Of all the components of radical reform, I think a Tobin tax is bottom of the list ... It's not thought to be the answer to the 'Too Big to Fail' problem—there's much more support for the idea of a US-type levy."
- India: India remains opposed to a global FTT. A senior Finance Ministry official argued that the proposed tax would put an additional burden on the domestic banking system.
- Sweden: Sweden opposes a FTT if it is applied only in the European Union.
- United States: The US Secretary of the Treasury Lloyd Bentsen initially supported a FTT in 1994. In 2004, Representative Chaka Fattah of Pennsylvania introduced a bill in the US House of Representatives (H.R. 3759) that would require a study to reform the Federal tax code through eliminating federal income tax and replacing it with a transaction fee-based system. In 2010 he introduced the "Debt Free America Act" (H.R. 4646), that goes further and proposes to enact a 1% FFT and eliminate federal income tax. Both bills never made it out of committee. On 24 September 2009, Paul Volcker (former US Federal Reserve chairman) "said he was 'very interested' by ideas for a tax on transactions between banks". On 3 December 2009, 22 representatives in the United States House of Representatives supported the "Let Wall Street Pay for the Restoration of Main Street Bill", which contained a domestic financial transaction tax. On 7 December 2009, Nancy Pelosi, Speaker of the United States House of Representatives stated her support for a "G-20 global tax". However, already on 6 November 2009, US Treasury Secretary Timothy Geithner, following UK Prime Minister Gordon Brown's call for a global FTT, expressed US opposition to the proposal saying: "A day-by-day financial transaction tax is not something we're prepared to support". Instead Geither favors an ongoing levy charged against large banks. On 13 December 2009, Paul Volcker, chairman of the US Economic Recovery Advisory Board under President Barack Obama, said he "instinctively opposed" any tax on financial transactions. "But it may be worthwhile to look into the current proposals as long as the result is not predetermined. That would at least end all this renewed talk about the idea, but overall I am skeptical about these ideas." By 2011, Volcker was more open to the idea of a transaction tax as a means to slow down trading.
  According to Ron Suskind, the author of "Confidence Men", a book based on 700 hours of interviews with high-level staff of the US administration, President Obama supported a FTT on trades of stocks, derivatives, and other financial instruments, but it was blocked by Obama's former director of the National Economic Council Larry Summers.

==== Other opposers ====
Most hedge funds managers fiercely oppose FTT. So does the economist and former member of Bank of England Charles Goodhart. The Financial Times, the Asia-Pacific Economic Cooperation Business Advisory Council, the Confederation of British Industry, and the Adam Smith Institute have also spoken out against a global financial transaction tax.

=== IMF's position ===
In 2001, the IMF conducted considerable research that opposes a transaction tax. On 11 December 2009, the Financial Times reported "Since the 7 Nov [2009] summit of the G20 Finance Ministers, the head of the International Monetary Fund, Mr Strauss-Kahn, seems to have softened his doubts, telling the CBI employers' conference: 'We have been asked by the G20 to look into financial sector taxes. ... This is an interesting issue. ... We will look at it from various angles and consider all proposals.'" When the IMF presented its interim report for the G20 on 16 April 2010, it laid out three options: a bank tax, a Financial Activities Tax (FAT), and a third option (which was not promoted but not ruled out), a financial transaction tax. On 16 April 2011, the IMF stated, it does not endorse a financial transaction tax, believing it "does not appear well suited to the specific purposes set out in the mandate from the G-20 leaders". However, it concedes that "The FTT should not be dismissed on grounds of administrative practicality".

Challenging the IMF's belittling of the financial transaction tax, Stephan Schulmeister of the Austrian Institute of Economic Research found that, "the assertion of the IMF paper, that a financial transaction tax 'is not focused on the core sources of financial instability', does not seem to have a solid foundation in the empirical evidence." Additionally, the IMF's watchdog group, the Independent Evaluation Office (IEO), released a report in 2011 which questioned the quality and level of bias in the IMF's research between 1999 and 2008. The report indicated that "there is a widely held perception that IMF research is message driven. About half of the authorities held this view, and more than half of the staff indicated that they felt pressure to align their conclusions with IMF policies and positions."

== Public opinion ==
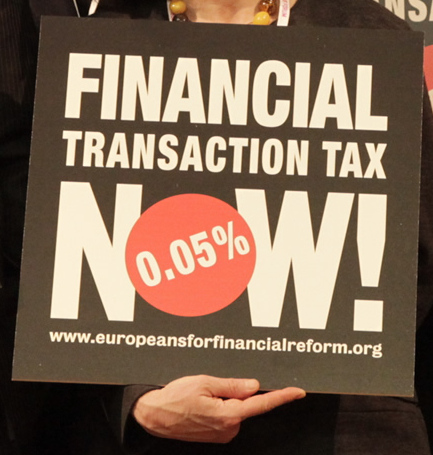
Europeans for Financial Reform

=== Europe ===
A 2011 survey published by YouGov suggested that more than four out of five people in the UK, France, Germany, Spain and Italy thought the financial sector has a responsibility to help repair the damage caused by the economic crisis. A 2011 Eurobarometer poll of more than 27,000 people found that Europeans were in favour of a Financial Transactions Tax, by a margin of 61% to 26%. It found that Europeans "strongly support the various measures that the European Union could adopt to reform the global financial markets... about the introduction of a tax on financial transactions, this proposal is nevertheless supported by more than six out of ten respondents (61%). A quarter of Europeans are against it, possibly because of the fear that they themselves might be subject to this tax."

== See also ==
- 1998–2002 Argentine great depression
- 2008–2009 Keynesian resurgence
- ATTAC – Association for the Taxation of Financial Transactions for the Aid of Citizens
- Bank for International Settlements
- Bank tax
- Central banks – which issue currency
- Credit crunch
- Currency crisis
- Exorbitant privilege
- Fluctuation in exchange rates
- Foreign exchange controls
- Foreign exchange market
- Liquidity crisis
- Money market
- Noise (economic)
- Speculative attack
- Speculation in foreign exchange markets
- Spot market
- Sudden stop (economics)
- Volatility risk
- Consequences of currency volatility
