= IIPF =

IIPF may refer to:

- International Institute of Public Finance, a global organization of economists specializing in public finance
- Islamic Iran Participation Front, a former reformist political party in Iran
