= Financial institutions duty =

The Financial institutions duty (FID) was a duty levied by all Australian states and territories, except Queensland, on deposits to bank accounts, term deposits, and similar.

The tax was introduced in the different states on dates between 1982 and 1992. It was abolished in all states from 1 July 2001 as part of the package of reforms for the goods and services tax. The bank account debits tax was also abolished as part of this package.

The duty was a percentage of the amount deposited, but with a maximum tax per deposit on ordinary accounts,

	ACT, NSW, Tas, Vic, WA	NT	SA
Rate	0.06%	0.06%	0.065%
Max per deposit	$1,200	$1,500	$1,200

For term deposit or short-term money market investments there was no limit on the duty per deposit. But for amounts of $50,000 or more and up to 185 days the duty was reduced by the number of days divided by 365; so, for example, was 0.0012% on a 73-day investment (1/5 of the year).

The duty was levied according to the state where the bank account was domiciled, not where the account holder lived. As calculated by the Australian Bankers' Association, about $1 billion per year was being collected just before its abolition.

== Legislation ==
- Stamp Duties Act 1920 (New South Wales)
- Financial Institutions Duty Act 1982 (Victoria)
- Financial Institutions Duty Act 1983 (Western Australia), with effect 1 January 1984.
- Financial Institutions Duty Act 1983 (South Australia)
- Financial Institutions Duty Act 1986 (Tasmania)
- Financial Institutions Duty Act 1989 (Northern Territory)
- Financial Institutions Duty Determination 1992 (Australian Capital Territory)

== See also ==
- Taxation in Australia
