= Edgar L. Feige =

German-American economist (born 1937)

- Born: 19 September 1937 (age 89); Berlin, Germany

Academic background
- Education: University of Chicago; Columbia University
- Doctoral advisor: Milton Friedman

Academic work
- Institutions: University of Wisconsin–Madison
- Doctoral students: Kenneth Singleton

Edgar L. Feige (born 19 September 1937) is an emeritus professor of economics at the University of Wisconsin–Madison. A graduate of Columbia University (BA. 1958) and the University of Chicago (Ph.D., 1963), he has taught at Yale University; the University of Essex; Erasmus University and held the Cleveringa Chair, at the University of Leiden in 1981–82. He has published widely on such topics as underground and shadow economies; tax evasion; transition economics; financial transaction taxes the Automated Payment Transaction tax (APT tax); and monetary theory and policy. He has consulted with various US and international government agencies.

== Selected publications ==
=== Books ===
- The Demand for Liquid Assets, Prentice Hall, 1963
- The Underground Economies: Tax Evasion and Information Distortion, Cambridge University Press, 1989
- Underground Economies in Transition: Unrecorded Activity, Tax Evasion, Corruption and Organized Crime, Ashgate, 1999.

=== Academic articles ===
- Taxation for the 21st century: The Automated Payment Transaction (APT) Tax, Economic Policy, October 2000.
- Starting Over: The Automated Payment Transaction Tax, Milken Institute Review, 2001.
