= Automated Payment Transaction tax =

Form of tax

The Automated Payment Transaction (APT) tax is a small, uniform tax on all economic transactions, which would involve simplification, base broadening, reductions in marginal tax rates, the elimination of tax and information returns and the automatic collection of tax revenues at the payment source. This proposal is to replace all United States taxes with a single tax (using a low rate) on every transaction in the economy. The APT approach would extend the tax base from income, consumption and wealth to all transactions. Proponents regard it as a revenue neutral transactions tax, whose tax base is primarily made up of financial transactions. It is based on the fundamental view of taxation as a "public brokerage fee accessed by the government to pay for the provision of the monetary, legal and political institutions that protect private property rights and facilitate market trade and commerce." The APT tax extends the tax reform ideas of John Maynard Keynes, James Tobin and Lawrence Summers, to their logical conclusion, namely to tax the broadest possible tax base at the lowest possible tax rate. The goal is to significantly improve economic efficiency, enhance stability in financial markets, and reduce to a minimum the costs of tax administration (assessment, collection, and compliance costs).

== History ==
The system was developed by University of Wisconsin–Madison Professor of Economics Dr. Edgar L. Feige, a student of Milton Friedman who earned his PhD in economics at the University of Chicago. Feige first presented the idea of taxing all transactions at the International Institute of Public Finance meetings in Buenos Aires, Argentina in 1989. Brazil took Feige's advise and adopted a plan similar to the APT tax. However, Brazil added it on top of its existing taxes. Despite this, the tax has been relatively successful according to a 2009 report. It was first put in the US national spotlight in February 2003 when it was covered by The New York Times. The Times endorsed the plan as "fair, simple, and efficient." On April 28, 2005, the APT proposal was presented to the President's Advisory Panel on Federal Tax Reform in Washington, DC. Economists at the World Bank in 2010 noted Feige's proposal for a "comprehensive automated payments tax applied at a very low rate... replacing a wide range of other taxes and greatly reducing the deadweight cost of the entire tax system."

Dr. William J. Hermann Jr. has been one of the most vocal supporters of the APT tax in recent decades, becoming the Director of a group advocating for the tax in 2004. In 2021, Dr. Hermann began pushing a differing proposal called the Automated Deposit Tax, which he also calls the "Tiny Tax." He says it is a combination of a Tobin Tax and APT tax. It would only charge the party depositing money into their account, rather than both parties to a transaction.

In 2019, the Lighthouse Law Club, led by Mark Emery Boswell, began supporting and promoting the idea.

Additionally, another similar proposal (by an anonymous author) known as the Universal Exchange Tax (UET) has been proposed since circa 2010. The UET is a tax on all electronic transactions of any kind that pass through any clearinghouse, albeit with some subtle differences (such as only taxing one side of each transaction rather than splitting it to both sides). A rate of 0.1% in the US at the federal level is estimated to be able to raise up to 5 trillion dollars (on an estimated tax base of 5 quadrillion dollars), assuming no significant shrinking of the tax base, which is more optimistic than Feige's proposal.

== Overview ==
The APT tax was originally proposed to replace the entire federal and state tax system - including income, corporate profits, excise and estate taxes - in favor of a tiny tax on all transactions. The tax would be automatically deducted from special taxpayer accounts, linked by software to all accounts at financial institutions capable of making final payments to the government seamlessly in real-time. The APT tax non-profit organization advocated for an Automated Payment Transaction Tax writes that under the plan that financial account opened by a taxable organization or individual would pay the same percentage on all incoming and outgoing funds on the account. The tax "would be automatically transferred to a federal government tax collection account in the same institution." The group goes on to add that the funds would be "taxed and collected immediately, without recording who or what was the source of funds or the recipient" and that the practice would "eliminate the need for filing tax returns and information returns, freeing individuals and businesses of enormous costs of tax compliance and greatly reducing the government's costs of collection and enforcement."

The rate of the tax is measured as the Electronic Single Side Rate (ESSR). The ESSR is the tax rate charged to each individual. If the ESSR were 1%, then both parties to a transaction would pay the 1% tax. If a person were transferring money from one account to another, each account would pay a rate of 1%. For this transaction, the government would receive a combined rate of 2%. Dr. Feige writes that the tax could be as low as 0.3% to remain revenue neutral using data from 2005. Instead of acquiring taxes solely based on income (whether corporate or individual), the APT tax would broaden the tax base to include Stocks, Bonds, and Options Transfers, Money Saving Transactions, Goods and Services, and Foreign Exchange related transactions. The ultimate goal is for the APT tax to fund not only the Federal Government, but also "all state budgets (allowing the elimination of state income, sales, and excise taxes) as well as the public school portion of the local property tax."

Dr. Feige claims that the APT tax would be very simple, efficient, and hard to evade. He writes, "Since every transaction must be settled by some means of final payment, taxes are routinely assessed and collected at source through the electronic technology of the automated banking/payment clearing system at the moment that economic exchange is evidenced by final payment. This automatic collection feature eliminates the need for individuals and firms to file tax and information returns. Real time tax collection at source of payment applies to all types of transactions, thereby reducing administration and compliance costs as well as opportunities for tax evasion." Some raise concerns about privacy—believing that such a tax would allow the government to see each transaction in the economy; however, Dr. Bill Hermann writes that it "only collects money by software in financial institutions."

The cash loophole is closed as well. Since cash goes through an average of 2.5 transactions between leaving a bank or other tax collecting entity, before it returns, a tax of 2.5 times the electronic single side rate would be charged on withdrawal and deposit.

With the proposed rate of 0.3%, there would be a tax of $0.75 per $100 cash entering or leaving what Dr. Feige calls a "taxing institution/account".

=== Progressive Debate ===
There is disagreement over whether the tax is progressive, with the debate primarily centered on whether the volume of taxed transactions rise disproportionately with a person's income and net worth. Simulations of the Federal Reserve's Survey of Consumer Finances demonstrate that high income and wealthy individuals undertake a disproportionate volume of transactions since they own a disproportionate share of financial assets that have relatively high turnover rates. However, since the APT tax has not yet been adopted, some argue that one can not predict whether the tax will be progressive or not. In 2016, Andrew VanHook wrote on his website promoting the proposal that the APT tax would lead to more fairness in taxation. "According to the Government Accountability Office, 65% of US companies, and 45% of US Households, pay nothing in taxes... [which] places a huge burden on the rest of us. It also undermines our democratic ideals, and leads to widespread resentment and distrust of our entire system. Under the Transaction Tax, everybody would pay their share with the assurance that everybody else was doing the same."

== Proposed implementation ==
Because the APT tax would radically affect taxation and the US economy, Dr. Feige recommends a 3 phase implementation. All rates listed below are based on Dr. Feige's 2005 report.

- Phase I: All Federal income, estate, and excise taxes are removed over a period of a few years with adjustments in the money supply to avoid excessive inflationary pressures.(0.15% ESSR)
- Phase II: Social security payroll taxes would be rolled into the APT rate.(0.24% ESSR)
- Phase III: A mechanism could be established, probably requiring a Constitutional amendment, where an entity controlled by Congress, would collect additional taxes under the APT system to fund all state budgets allowing the elimination of state income, sales, and excise taxes as well as the public school portion of the local property tax. (0.28% ESSR)

== See also ==
- Financial transactions tax
- Income tax in the United States
- Sales taxes in the United States
- Taxation in the United States
- Tax reform

== Other sources ==
- Feige, E. L. (1 October 2000). "Taxation for the 21st century: the automated payment transaction (APT) tax" (PDF). Economic Policy. 15 (31): 474–511. doi:10.1111/1468-0327.00067. S2CID 14540367.
- Feige, Edgar L. (March 2001). "Starting Over: The Automated Payment Transaction Tax". The Milken Institute Review. 3 (1): 42–53.
