= Bank account debits tax =

Australian tax

Bank account debits tax (BADT or BAD), typically called the bad tax in the media, was an Australian bank transaction tax, levied on customer withdrawals from bank accounts with a cheque facility (both withdrawals made by cheque or by another means, such as EFTPOS).

The tax was introduced by the federal government in 1982. The power to levy the tax was transferred to the states in 1990, except for Norfolk Island which did not charge it. The tax was abolished by the states on dates between 1 July 2002 and 1 July 2005 as part of the package of reforms for the introduction of the Goods and Services Tax (GST). The Financial Institutions Duty (FID) was also abolished as part of this package.

The BAD tax was based on the amount withdrawn, and varied by state. The final rates were per the following table.

	Tas	ACT, NT, NSW, Qld, SA, Vic, WA
less than $1	nil	nil
$1 to less than $100	$0.15	$0.15
$100 to less than $500	$0.35	$0.70
$500 to less than $5,000	$0.75	$1.50
$5,000 to less than $10,000	$1.50	$3.00
$10,000 or more	$2.00	$4.00

The tax was levied according to the state where the bank account was domiciled, not where the account holder lived. A total of about $1 billion per year was being collected near the end of its full operation in 2001 (according to the Australian Bankers' Association).

Since the tax applied only to cheque accounts, bank customers could choose not to have a cheque facility to avoid the tax, or could keep a separate cheque account used only when needing to write a cheque.

== Bank errors ==
On 11 May 2005, the National Australia Bank announced it had incorrectly collected bank account debits taxes, totalling some $10 million, from 140,000 bank accounts. The bank announced a plan to reimburse customers for the $10 million incorrectly collected and a further $4 million in interest owed. However, since the problem might have dated back to the introduction of the tax on 31 December 1982, there were insufficient records to identify all affected customers.

== Legislation ==
- Debits Tax Act 1982 (Commonwealth)
- Debits Tax Administration Act 1982 (Commonwealth)
- Debits Tax Act 1990 (New South Wales)
- Debits Tax Act 1990 (Queensland)
- Debits Tax Act 1990 (South Australia)
- Debits Tax Act 1990 (Tasmania)
- Debits Tax Act 1990 (Victoria)
- Debits Tax Act 1990 (Western Australia)
- Debits Tax Act 1990 (Northern Territory)
- Debits Tax Act 1997 (Australian Capital Territory)

== See also ==
- Taxation in Australia
- Bank transaction tax
