= Financial Crisis Responsibility Fee =

The Financial Crisis Responsibility Fee was a bank tax proposed by U.S. President Barack Obama in January 2010, to apply to financial firms with $50 billion (~$68.2 billion in 2023) or more in consolidated assets. The fee would have been payable until the firm had paid off all money provided to it under the Troubled Assets Relief Program (TARP). Approximately 50 banks and similar firms would have been charged the fee, raising a total of roughly $9 billion a year for at least 10 years. The fee would continue to be payable for longer if required to fully recover TARP costs.

The fee would only apply to those U.S. firms, or firms that received TARP subsidies, with $50 billion or more in consolidated assets. The fee would be calculated by taking the total assets, subtracting that amount from Tier 1 capital and insured deposits, and then tax the remaining amount at a 0.15% rate.

In February 2010, the Obama administration made an announcement to further justify the imposition of the fee:

"Excessive risk undertaken by major financial firms was a significant cause of the recent financial crisis. . . . The fee would . . . provide a deterrent against excessive leverage for the largest financial firms."

As of February 2012, the fee had still not been enacted.

The fee was proposed to satisfy the requirement in the Emergency Economic Stabilization Act, which authorized TARP, to propose specific measures to recoup TARP losses from the financial industry.

If the proposal had passed, the proceeds would have gone into general government revenue and been used to pay the TARP costs of the 2008 financial crisis rather than gone into an insurance fund in anticipation of the next one.

== Evaluation ==
This proposal has received mixed support. It was endorsed in a Tulane Law Review article that evaluated it along with other financial-industry tax-reform proposals, including the Defazio Financial Transactions Tax. The author favorably noted that the plan would (1) "eviscerate . . . a preexisting tax law preference for debt financing," and (2) "discourage the [concentration of power in] massive banks." Nonetheless, the author expressed concern that the Fee would (1) increase tax-compliance costs and (2) be unfair to stockholders of the affected banks.

== See also ==
- Let Wall Street Pay for the Restoration of Main Street Bill
