= Peter DeFazio =

American politician (born 1947)

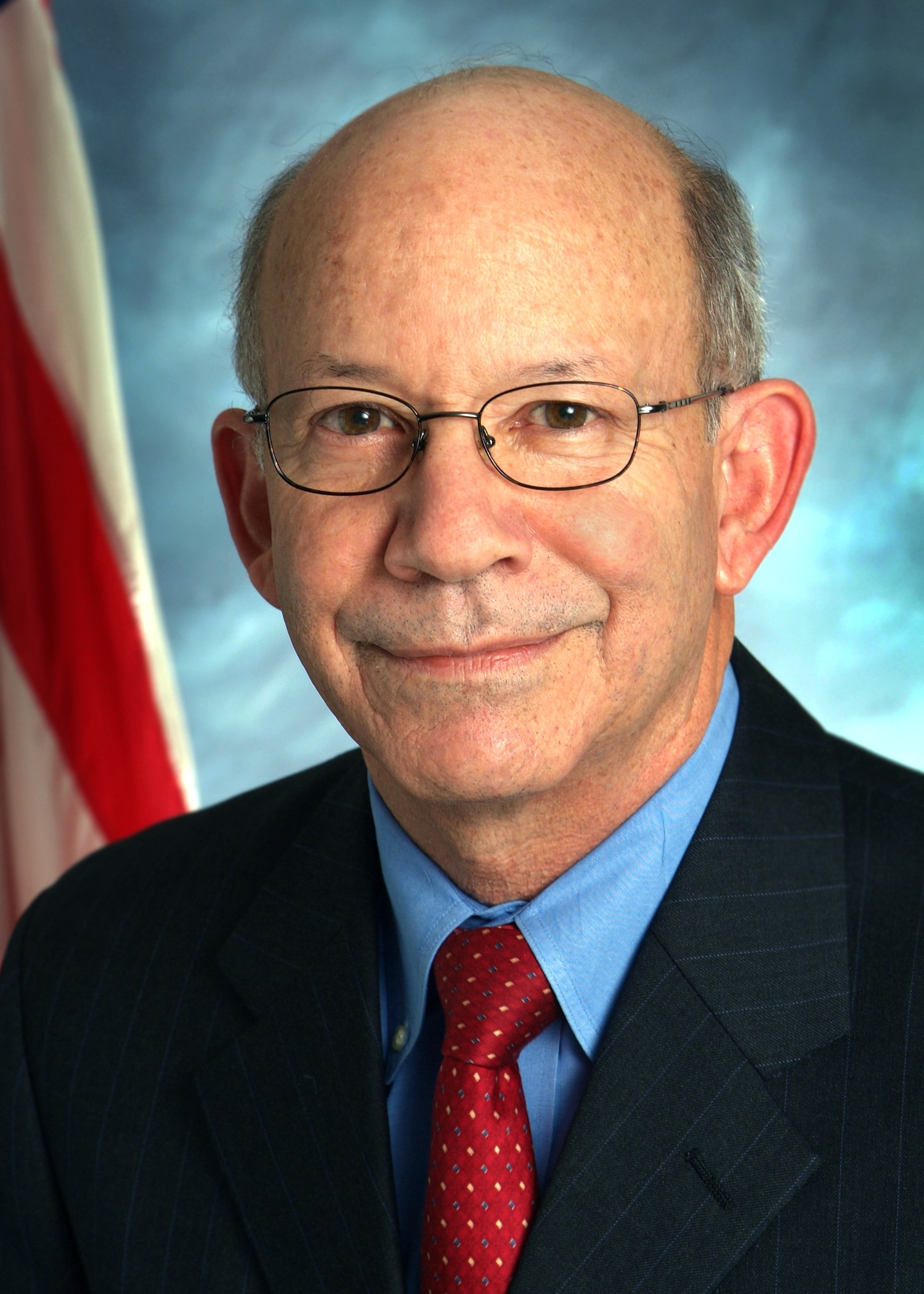

Chair of the House Transportation Committee
- In office January 3, 2019 – January 3, 2023
- Preceded by: Bill Shuster
- Succeeded by: Sam Graves

Chair of the Congressional Progressive Caucus
- In office January 3, 2003 – January 3, 2005
- Preceded by: Dennis Kucinich
- Succeeded by: Barbara Lee; Lynn Woolsey

Member of the U.S. House of Representatives from Oregon's 4th district
- In office January 3, 1987 – January 3, 2023
- Preceded by: Jim Weaver
- Succeeded by: Val Hoyle

Personal details
- Born: Peter Anthony DeFazio; May 27, 1947 (age 79) Needham, Massachusetts, U.S.
- Party: Democratic
- Spouse: Myrnie Daut
- Education: Tufts University (BA); University of Oregon (MA)

Military service
- Branch/service: United States Air Force
- Years of service: 1967–1971
- Unit: Air Force Reserve Command
- DeFazio's voice DeFazio on legislation mandating aircraft safety standards after the Boeing 737 MAX groundings. Recorded November 17, 2020

Peter Anthony DeFazio (/dɪˈfɑːzioʊ/ dif-AH-zee-oh; born May 27, 1947) is an American politician who served as the U.S. representative for Oregon's 4th congressional district from 1987 to 2023. He is a member of the Democratic Party and is a founder of the Congressional Progressive Caucus. A native of Massachusetts and a veteran of the United States Air Force Reserve, he previously served as a county commissioner in Lane County, Oregon. On December 1, 2021, DeFazio announced he would not seek reelection in 2022.

== Early life, education, and pre-congressional career ==
DeFazio was born in 1947 in Needham, Massachusetts, a suburb of Boston, graduating from Needham High School in 1965. He credits his great-uncle with shaping his politics; that great-uncle almost never said "Republican" without adding "bastard" (or "bastud", as it sounded in a Boston accent). He served in the United States Air Force Reserve from 1967 to 1971. He received a Bachelor of Arts degree from Tufts University in 1969 and a Master of Arts degree in gerontology from the University of Oregon in 1977.

From 1977 to 1982, DeFazio worked as an aide to U.S. Representative Jim Weaver. He was elected as a Lane County Commissioner in 1983 and served as chairman from 1985 to 1986.

== U.S. House of Representatives ==
=== Elections ===
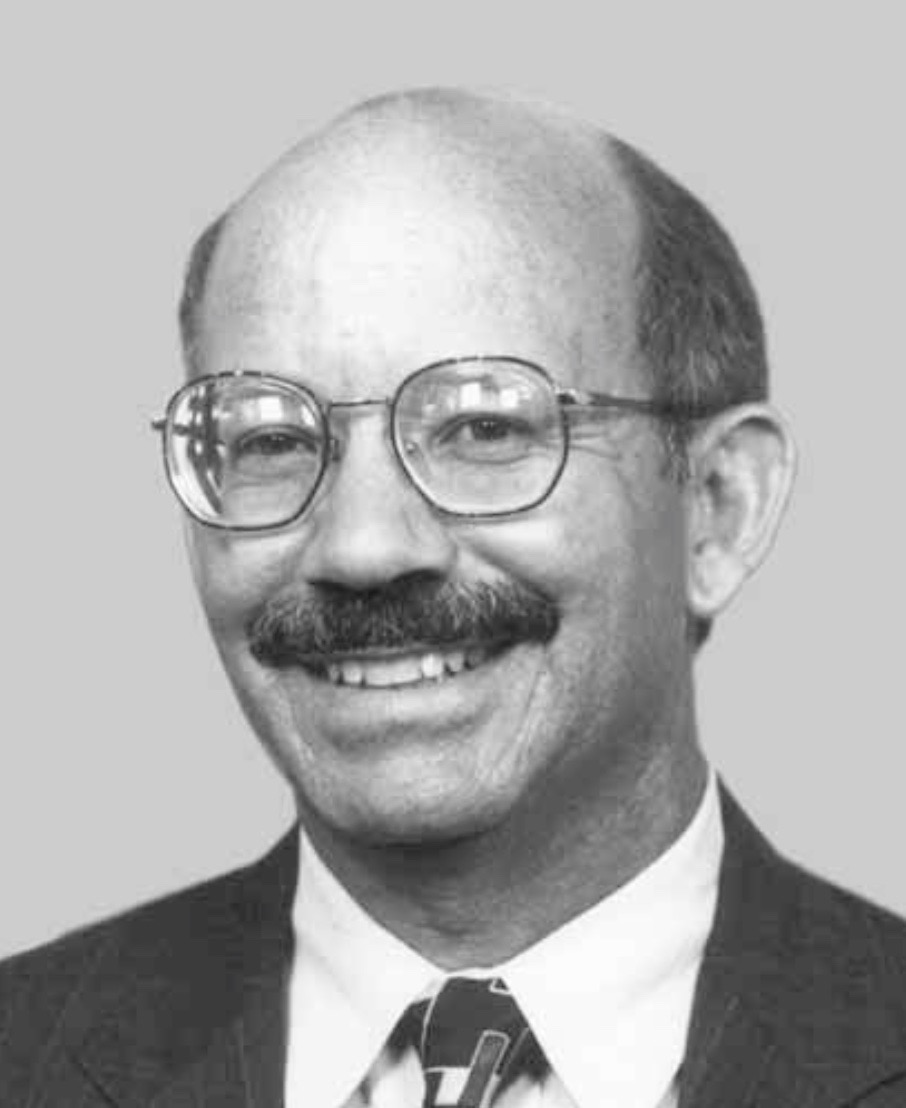
DeFazio during the 105th Congress (1997–1999)

In 1986, DeFazio ran for the U.S. House from Oregon's 4th congressional district, upon the retirement of incumbent Democratic congressman Jim Weaver. DeFazio narrowly won a competitive three-way primary against State Senators Bill Bradbury and Margie Hendriksen, 34%–33%-31%. He won the general election with 54% of the vote.

DeFazio did not face another contest nearly that close until 2010, winning every election before then with at least 61% of the vote. He forged a nearly unbreakable hold on a district that was only marginally Democratic on paper. This is due almost entirely to the presence of his base in Lane County, which had almost half the district's population. The district narrowly voted for George W. Bush in 2000 (due mainly to Ralph Nader being on the ballot), John Kerry in 2004, and Hillary Clinton by 0.1 percentage point in 2016. In 2020, DeFazio defeated Alek Skarlatos by over 25,000 votes (5.4%). Pacific Green Party candidate Daniel Hoffay finished third with 2.2% of the vote.

==== 2008 ====
DeFazio won 82% of the vote over two minor-party candidates.

Earlier, he reportedly considered and reconsidered running against Gordon H. Smith in the 2008 Senate election. On April 20, 2007, DeFazio announced he would not run for Smith's seat.

After Barack Obama was elected president in 2008, it was reported that DeFazio was under consideration for Secretary of Transportation. U.S. Representative Ray LaHood was named to the post in December 2008.

==== 2010 ====
In 2010, DeFazio was challenged by Republican Art Robinson and Pacific Green candidate Michael Beilstein. As permitted by Citizens United v. Federal Election Commission, a Super PAC group called The Concerned Taxpayers of America paid $300,000 for ads attacking DeFazio. It was not revealed until the mid-October 2010 quarterly FEC filings that the group was solely funded by Daniel G. Schuster Inc., a concrete firm in Owings Mills, Maryland, and New York hedge fund executive Robert Mercer, the co-head of Renaissance Technologies of Setauket, New York. According to Dan Eggen at The Washington Post, the group said "it was formed in September 'to engage citizens from every walk of life and political affiliation' in the fight against 'runaway spending.'" The only expenditures were for the ads attacking DeFazio and Democratic Representative Frank Kratovil of Maryland.

DeFazio won with 54.5% of the vote, his lowest winning percentage since he was first elected in 1986. The Oregonian said that DeFazio's reelection to his 13th term was notable more for the amount of outside money spent on the campaign than for the candidates themselves.

==== 2012 ====
In September 2011, the National Journal cited DeFazio as an example of "swing-district Democrats seeking reelection in 2012", and who, in "begin[ning] to focus on their reelection bids after Labor Day...are increasingly calculating how close is too close to an unpopular President Obama." It also noted that DeFazio's district "nearly went for Republican George W. Bush in 2004."

Redistricting made the 4th slightly friendlier for DeFazio. He picked up almost all of Benton County, including all of Corvallis, home to Oregon State University.

==== 2020 ====
DeFazio faced a challenge in 2020 from Alek Skarlatos, a Roseburg High School graduate, a former Oregon National Guard soldier who helped subdue a terrorist in the 2015 Thalys train attack. DeFazio won the election by 5.3 points, his narrowest victory since taking office.

=== Tenure ===
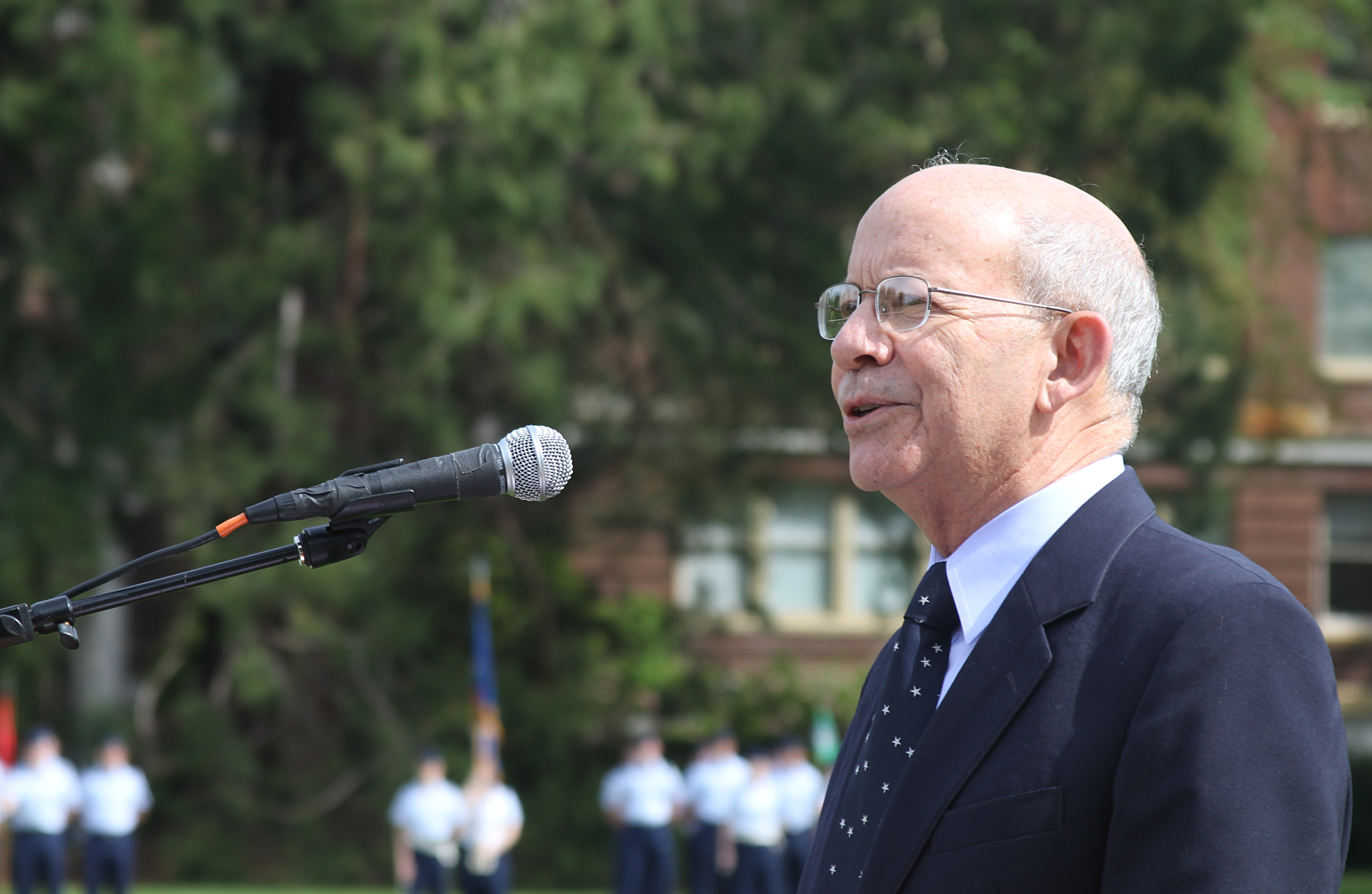
DeFazio speaks at Oregon State University in 2014

DeFazio has a progressive voting record. In 1992, he co-founded the Congressional Progressive Caucus with Bernie Sanders, Ron Dellums, Lane Evans, Thomas Andrews, and Maxine Waters, and was its chair from 2003 to 2005. During the 1999 World Trade Organization meetings in Seattle, DeFazio marched with protesters who opposed the WTO's new economic globalization policies.

=== Political positions ===
==== Infrastructure ====
DeFazio spent his entire career on the Transportation and Infrastructure Committee, becoming its chairman when Democrats won the House in 2018. During his time on the committee, he served as chair or ranking member of four of the six subcommittees: Aviation, Coast Guard and Maritime Transportation, Highways and Transit, and Water Resources and Environment.

In 2020, DeFazio sponsored H.R. 2, the Moving Forward Act. This bill invested $1.5 trillion in highways, rail, transit, airports, ports and harbors, wastewater and drinking water infrastructure, brownfields, broadband, and more.

DeFazio felt shunted aside when Senate negotiators secured a deal on the Infrastructure Investment and Jobs Act which became law largely without input from the House. He blasted the legislation in closed-door meetings, earning the moniker the "Tiger of the House".

DeFazio eventually supported and helped pass the Infrastructure Investment and Jobs Act and joined President Biden a number of times to promote it.

==== Investigation into Boeing and 737 MAX crashes ====
As chair of the House Transportation and Infrastructure Committee, DeFazio led an investigation into the causes of the crashes of two Boeing 737 MAX planes, which resulted in 346 deaths. DeFazio's 18-month investigation laid out serious flaws and missteps in the design, development, and certification of the aircraft. The committee's Majority Staff prepared a 238-page report outlining the repeated and serious failures made by Boeing and the Federal Aviation Administration.

DeFazio helped pass comprehensive aircraft certification reform and safety legislation in the wake of his committee's report as part of the Consolidated Appropriations Act, 2021, which President Donald Trump signed into law on December 27, 2020.

In 2022, Netflix premiered Downfall: The Case Against Boeing, a documentary film by Rory Kennedy that details DeFazio's investigation.

==== Immigration ====
In October 2011, DeFazio demanded that the United States Department of Labor strengthen restrictions on the hiring of foreign guest workers for forestry jobs intended for unemployed U.S. citizens.

DeFazio issued a statement condemning President Donald Trump's January 2017 executive order suspending all refugee admissions to the U.S. for 120 days and barring entry for 90 days to immigrants from Iraq, Iran, Libya, Somalia, Sudan, Syria, and Yemen.

In January 2018, DeFazio's guest for the State of the Union Address was Jesus Narvaez, a "Dreamer", DACA activist, and member of Movimiento Estudiantil Chicanx de Aztlán (MEChA).

In June 2018, DeFazio and other members of Congress from Oregon demanded that Immigration and Customs Enforcement (ICE) permit individuals held at a federal prison in Sheridan, Oregon, under the Trump administration's "zero-tolerance policy" to make free telephone calls to arrange legal representation.

==== Abortion ====
DeFazio supports legal abortion.

==== Military ====
DeFazio has voted against legislation that would increase U.S. military power. In 2000, he voted against legislation to create a national missile defense network, calling the system a "comic book fantasy". He has consistently voted against the Patriot Act, including its inception after 9/11 and the recurring reauthorization bills, arguing that it infringes on Americans' civil rights. He also voted against the USA Freedom Act, which reauthorized certain provisions of the Patriot Act in modified form. He voted multiple times to set an itinerary for bringing U.S. troops home from Iraq.

==== Postal Service ====
In 2013, DeFazio introduced the Postal Service Protection Act, a bipartisan proposal to comprehensively reform the United States Postal Service. The legislation included a provision that would eliminate the retiree health benefits fund prefunding mandate, which required the Postal Service to set aside billions each year for retiree health benefits.

In 2019, DeFazio introduced the USPS Fairness Act, which would have solely repealed the prefunding mandate. In February 2020, the legislation passed the House, 309 to 106.

U.S. Representative Carolyn Maloney, chair of the House Oversight and Government Reform Committee, included DeFazio's provision to repeal the prefunding mandate in the Postal Service Reform Act, which President Biden signed into law on April 6, 2022.

==== Israel and Palestine ====
In 2015, DeFazio was one of 19 members of Congress to sign a letter urging Secretary of State John Kerry to "prioritize the human rights of Palestinian children living in the Occupied West Bank in the bilateral relationship with the Government of Israel." The letter called Israel's treatment of Palestinian children "cruel, inhumane and degrading" and an "anomaly in the world". In 2017, he was one of 10 members of Congress to introduce a bill that would "require the Secretary of State to certify that United States funds do not support military detention, interrogation, abuse, or ill-treatment of Palestinian children".

==== Financial ====
In 2008, DeFazio and Representative Pete Stark signed a letter to House Speaker Nancy Pelosi proposing a 0.25% transaction tax on all trades in financial instruments, including stocks, options, and futures. Subsequently, DeFazio introduced the "No BAILOUT Act."

Somewhat controversially, DeFazio declined to support the American Recovery and Reinvestment Act of 2009, voting against it on February 13, 2009. He was one of only seven Democratic House members to vote against the bill. DeFazio said that his vote was due to his frustration over compromises made to win support from moderate Republicans in the Senate. "I couldn't justify borrowing money for tax cuts", he said, referring to a bipartisan group's decision to cut funding for education and infrastructure initiatives he had supported in favor of steeper tax reductions. He also advocated that the U.S. Senate change its cloture rules, doing away with the filibuster.

DeFazio made headlines in mid-November 2009 when he suggested in an interview with MSNBC commentator Ed Schultz that Obama should fire Treasury Secretary Timothy Geithner and National Economic Council Director Lawrence Summers. "We may have to sacrifice just two more jobs to get back millions for Americans", DeFazio said. The comment made top headlines at The Huffington Post. DeFazio also suggested that a formal call by the Congressional Progressive Caucus for Geithner and Summers to be removed might be forthcoming. A year later he called for the impeachment of Chief Justice John Roberts because of the Supreme Court ruling in Citizens United v. Federal Election Commission.

In 2009, DeFazio proposed a financial transaction tax.

During his tenure, DeFazio has butted heads with fellow Democratic politicians, including Obama, on key Democratic legislation. In December 2010, he told CNN that the White House was "putting on tremendous pressure" about legislation extending the Bush tax cuts, with Obama "making phone calls saying this is the end of his presidency if he doesn't get this bad deal." White House spokesman Tommy Vietor told The Hill that Obama hadn't "said anything remotely like that" and had "never spoken with Mr. DeFazio about the issue".

==== Occupy Wall Street ====
In August 2011, DeFazio said that Obama lacked the fight to follow through on ending the Bush tax cuts, citing the pressure placed on him by the Republicans. DeFazio, Representative Dennis Kucinich and Senator Bernie Sanders said that it would be good for the Democratic Party if Obama faced a meaningful primary in which all the issues would be aired out.

In October 2011, Think Progress noted that DeFazio was echoing the demands of the Occupy Wall Street protesters by proposing to tax the trading of stocks, bonds, and derivatives.

==== Fuel prices ====
DeFazio opposed the Lowering Gasoline Prices to Fuel an America That Works Act of 2014 (H.R. 4899; 113th Congress), a bill that would revise existing laws and policies regarding the development of oil and gas resources on the Outer Continental Shelf. The bill was intended to increase domestic energy production and lower gas prices. DeFazio argued that the bill would not solve the true cause of high gas prices, which he blamed on "Big Oil in the United States and speculation on Wall Street". DeFazio called the bill the "drill everywhere" bill.

In 2022, following a report from Accountable.US that showed the largest oil and gas companies in the United States made a record $205 billion profit in 2021, DeFazio introduced the Stop Gas Price Gouging Tax and Rebate Act. This legislation would impose a windfall profits tax on excessive corporate profits and return the revenue to Americans in monthly payments.

==== Health insurance reform ====
In 2020, DeFazio introduced legislation to repeal a law that allows insurance companies an exemption from antitrust enforcement. The Competitive Health Insurance Reform Act. It gives the Department of Justice and Federal Trade Commission the authority to apply federal antitrust laws to any potential anti-competitive behavior by health insurance companies. President Trump signed the legislation into law in January 2021.

==== Harbor Maintenance Trust Fund ====
In December 2020, DeFazio helped pass the bipartisan Water Resources Development Act of 2020. This legislation included a measure he fought for for decades which would allow Congress to appropriate any funds collected from the Harbor Maintenance Trust Fund for authorized harbor maintenance needs. This unlocked billions in already collected fees to support the infrastructure of federal ports and harbors.

==== Organic farming standards ====
DeFazio and Senator Patrick Leahy are credited with helping establish the National Organic Program in the 1990 Farm Bill.

DeFazio co-chaired the bipartisan House Organic Caucus.

In 2022, following news of his retirement, the Organic Trade Association honored DeFazio with the Organic Champion Award for his career-long work to support a strong organic label.

==== Animal welfare ====
In February 2022, the House of Representatives approved an amendment to the America COMPETES Act introduced by DeFazio that would ban the farming of mink for fur. Supporters argued that fur farming is inhumane and promotes the spread of zoonotic disease. The amendment was not included in the Senate version of the bill and did not become law.

=== Committee assignments ===
- Committee on Transportation and Infrastructure (Chair)

=== Caucus memberships ===
- Animal Protection Caucus
- Bike Caucus
- Coast Guard Caucus
- Community Health Care Caucus
- Congressional Arts Caucus
- Congressional Biomass Caucus
- Congressional NextGen 9-1-1 Caucus
- Congressional Progressive Caucus
- Healthy Forest Caucus
- House Small Brewer's Caucus (Founder and Co-Chair)
- Human Rights Caucus
- Indian Caucus
- Northwest Energy Caucus (Co-Chair)
- Organic Caucus (Co-Chair)
- Populist Caucus
- Pro-Choice Caucus
- Renewable Energy and Energy Efficiency Caucus
- Rural Caucus
- Sportsmen's Caucus
- United States Congressional International Conservation Caucus
- Veterinary Medicine Caucus
- Waterways Caucus
- Medicare for All Caucus

== U.S. Senate elections ==
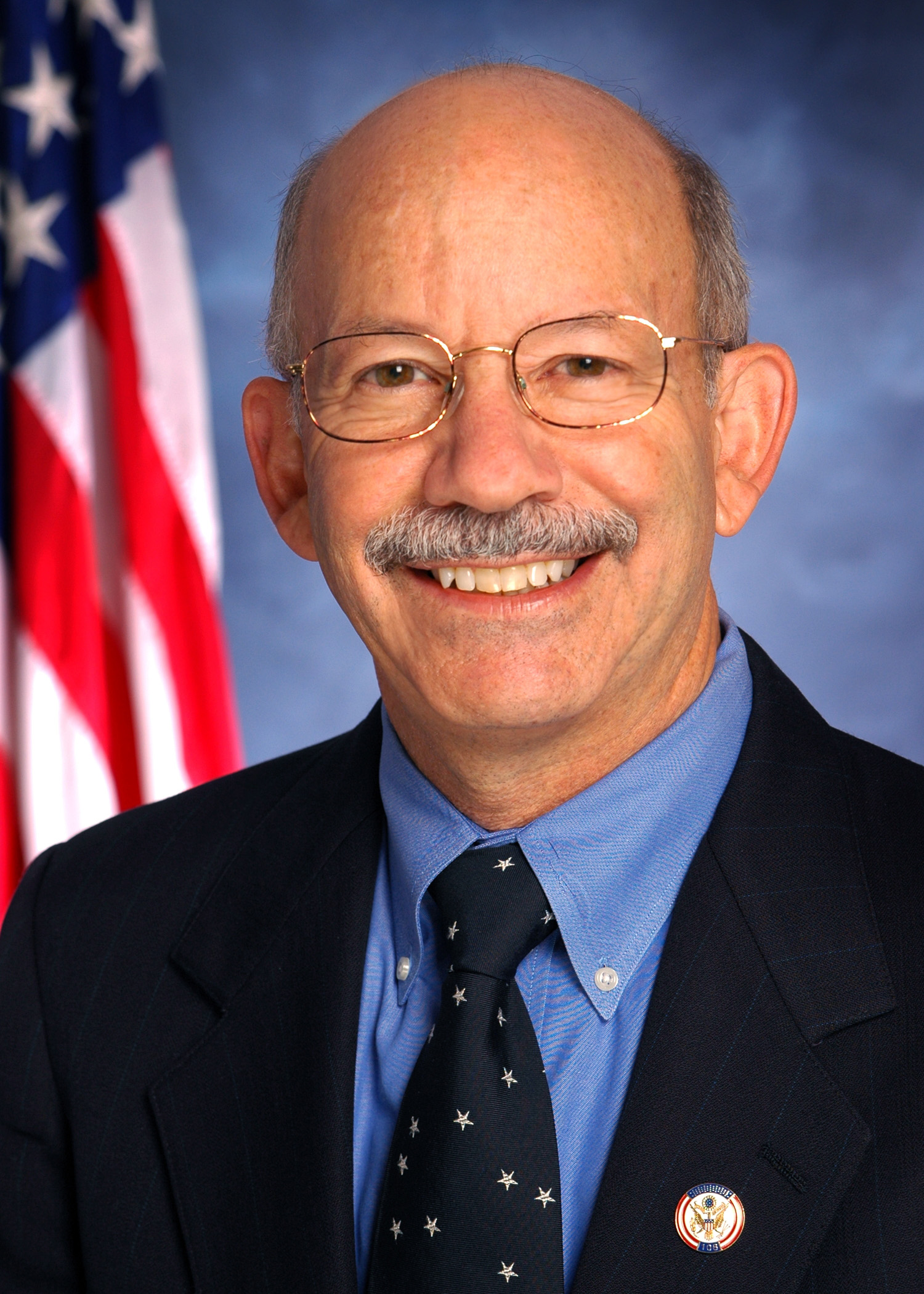
DeFazio during the 109th Congress

=== 1995 ===
After Senator Bob Packwood resigned in early September 1995, DeFazio ran unsuccessfully for the Democratic nomination for the United States Senate in a special primary, losing to 3rd district Congressman Ron Wyden.

=== 1996 ===
DeFazio had been mentioned as a possible candidate for the seat of Senator Mark Hatfield, who announced after the special primary election that he would not seek reelection in 1996. Faced with the prospect of having to take on well-funded millionaires in both the primary and general election, DeFazio announced in February 1996 that he would not run.

=== 2008 ===
DeFazio again considered running for the United States Senate. At the time he was considered a top-tier candidate, but he later defused such talk, citing seniority and monetary concerns about a potential campaign.

== Post-Senate career ==
From 2023 to 2024, DeFazio served as the Wayne Morse Chair of Law and Politics, established in honor of the former Oregon Senator, at the University of Oregon.

== Personal life ==
DeFazio is a member of the Roman Catholic Church. He and his wife, Myrnie L. Daut, reside in Springfield.

== Electoral history ==
Oregon's 4th congressional district: Results 1986–2020
Year	Democratic	Votes	%	Republican	Votes	%	Third Party	Party	Votes	%	Third Party	Party	Votes	%	Other	%
1986	Peter DeFazio	105,697	54%	Bruce Long	89,795	46%									56	0%
1988	Peter DeFazio (incumbent)	108,483	72%	Jim Howard	42,220	28%									32	0%
1990	Peter DeFazio (incumbent)	162,494	86%	No candidate			Tonie Nathan	Libertarian	26,432	14%					426	0%
1992	Peter DeFazio (incumbent)	199,372	71%	Richard Schulz	79,733	29%									194	0%
1994	Peter DeFazio (incumbent)	158,981	67%	John Newkirk	78,947	33%									273	0%
1996	Peter DeFazio (incumbent)	177,270	66%	John Newkirk	76,649	28%	Tonie Nathan	Libertarian	4,919	2%	Bill Bonville	Reform	3,960	1%	7,058	3%
1998	Peter DeFazio (incumbent)	157,524	70%	Steve Webb	64,143	29%	Karl Sorg	Socialist	2,694	1%					276	0%
2000	Peter DeFazio (incumbent)	197,998	68%	John Lindsey	41,909	31%	David Duemler	Socialist	3,696	1%					421	0%
2002	Peter DeFazio (incumbent)	168,150	64%	Liz VanLeeuwen	90,523	34%	Chris Bigelow	Libertarian	4,602	2%					206	0%
2004	Peter DeFazio (incumbent)	228,611	61%	Jim Feldkamp	140,882	38%	Jacob Boone	Libertarian	3,190	1%	Michael Marsh	Constitution	1,799	0%	427	0%
2006	Peter DeFazio (incumbent)	180,607	62%	Jim Feldkamp	109,105	38%									532	0%
2008	Peter DeFazio (incumbent)	275,133	82%	No candidate			Jaynee Germond	Constitution	43,133	13%	Mike Beilstein	Pacific Green	13,162	4%	2,708	1%
2010	Peter DeFazio (incumbent)	162,416	54%	Art Robinson	129,877	44%	Mike Beilstein	Pacific Green	5,215	2%					524	0%
2012	Peter DeFazio (incumbent)	212,866	59%	Art Robinson	140,549	39%	Chuck Huntting	Libertarian	6,205	2%					468	0%
2014	Peter DeFazio (incumbent)	181,624	59%	Art Robinson	116,534	38%	Mike Beilstein	Pacific Green	6,863	2%	David L. Chester	Libertarian	4,676	2%	482	0%
2016	Peter DeFazio (incumbent)	220,628	55%	Art Robinson	157,743	40%	Mike Beilstein	Pacific Green	12,194	3%	Gil Guthrie	Libertarian	6,527	2%	476	0%
2018	Peter DeFazio (incumbent)	208,710	56%	Art Robinson	152,414	41%	Mike Beilstein	Pacific Green	5,956	2%	Richard Jacobson	Libertarian	5,370	1%	443	0%
2020	Peter DeFazio (incumbent)	240,950	52%	Alek Skarlatos	216,018	46%	Daniel Hoffay	Pacific Green	10,118	2%						

== See also ==
- DeFazio financial transaction tax
- National Security and Homeland Security Presidential Directive
- Continuity of Operations Plan

U.S. House of Representatives
Preceded by Jim Weaver	Member of the U.S. House of Representatives from Oregon's 4th congressional district 1987–2023	Succeeded by Val Hoyle
Preceded by Ed Markey	Ranking Member of the House Natural Resources Committee; 2013–2015	Succeeded by Raúl Grijalva
Preceded by Nick Rahall	Ranking Member of the House Transportation Committee; 2015–2019	Succeeded by Sam Graves
Preceded by Bill Shuster	Chair of the House Transportation Committee; 2019–2023	Succeeded by Sam Graves
Party political offices
Preceded by Dennis Kucinich	Chair of the Congressional Progressive Caucus; 2003–2005	Succeeded by Barbara Lee; Lynn Woolsey
U.S. order of precedence (ceremonial)
Preceded by Fred Upton as Former U.S. Representative	Order of precedence of the United States as Former U.S. Representative	Succeeded by Norm Dicks as Former U.S. Representative
