= Let Wall Street Pay for the Restoration of Main Street Bill =

2009 US proposed legislation

The proposed bill Let Wall Street Pay for the Restoration of Main Street Bill is officially contained in the United States House of Representatives bill entitled H.R. 4191: Let Wall Street Pay for the Restoration of Main Street Act of 2009. It is a proposed piece of legislation that was introduced into the United States House of Representatives on December 3, 2009 to assess a tax on US financial market securities transactions. Its official purpose is "to fund job creation and deficit reduction." Projected annual revenue is $150 billion per year, half of which would go towards deficit reduction and half of which would go towards job promotion activities.

== History ==
The US imposed a financial transaction tax from 1914 to 1966. The federal tax on stock sales of 0.1 per cent at issuance and 0.04 per cent on transfers. Currently, the US has a very minor 0.0034 per cent tax which is levied on stock transactions. The tax, known as Section 31 fee, is used to support the operation costs of the Securities and Exchange Commission (SEC). In 1998, the federal government collected $1.8 billion in revenue from these fees, almost five times the annual operating costs of the SEC.

U.S. Representative Peter Anthony DeFazio proposed a new financial transaction tax for within the United States in 2009. He first raised the idea earlier in 2009, and then officially introduced it as a bill on December 3, 2009. The day he introduced the bill, DeFazio said, "The American taxpayers bailed out Wall Street during a crisis brought on by reckless speculation in the financial markets. . ... This legislation will force Wall Street to do their part and put people displaced by that crisis back to work." The "bailout" he referred to was the US Emergency Economic Stabilization Act of 2008, and the "crisis" he referred to was the 2008 financial crisis. The day the bill was introduced, it had the support of 25 of DeFazio's House colleagues.

== Elements ==
These are the elements of his proposal:

Revenue Estimate for US Financial Transaction Tax
Tax base	Tax rate	Revenue estimate (US$ billion)
US stocks/equities	.25%	54-108
US bonds	.02%	26-52
US forex spot	.01%	8-16
US futures	.02%	7-14
US options	.5%	4-8
US swaps	.015%	23-46
US total		123-246

- Stock transactions would be assessed a tax of one-quarter-of-one percent (0.25 percent)
- The tax on futures contracts to buy or sell a specified commodity of standardized quality at a certain date in the future, at a market determined price would be 0.02 percent
- Swaps between two firms on certain benefits of one party's financial instrument for those of the other party's financial instrument would pay a 0.02 percent tax
- Credit default swaps where a contract is swapped through a series of payments in exchange for a payoff if a credit instrument (typically a bond or loan) goes into default would also pay a 0.02 percent levy

To ensure the tax is appropriately targeted to speculators and has no impact on the average investor and pension funds, the tax will be refunded for:

- tax-favored retirement accounts
- 401(k)s
- mutual funds
- education savings accounts
- health savings accounts
- the first $100,000 of transactions annually that are not already exempted

== Evaluation ==
Criticism of this bill has included (1) a December 2009 Wall Street Journal op-ed by Burton G. Malkiel and George U. Sauter; (2) a December 2009 online op-ed by Irene Aldridge; and (3) a December 2010 Tulane Law Review article by Richard T. Page, who has suggested that imposing a financial-transactions tax in response to the 2007-2010 economic downturn would be "foolish revenge". Page has instead lent lukewarm support to President Barack Obama's Financial Crisis Responsibility Fee.

=== Criticism from Malkiel and Sauter ===
On December 8, 2009, criticism came from Burton G. Malkiel and George U. Sauter. Some empirical researchers have expressed concern that financial transaction taxes would in practice become entirely pass-through, ultimately increasing transaction costs for long-term investors, rather than merely creating distortions and reducing market efficiency. For instance, Princeton University Professor of Economics Burton G. Malkiel, author of classic finance book A Random Walk Down Wall Street and several publications on mutual fund performance, predicted that:

Wall Street" would not foot the bill for the presumed $150 billion [transactions] tax. In fact, the tax would simply be added to the cost of doing business, burdening all investors, including 401(k) plans, IRAs and mutual funds.

Professor Malkiel argued that taxing speculators would reduce market efficiency, harming the economy:

Transactions taxes would make most current high-frequency trades unprofitable since they depend on the thinnest of profit margins. Trading volume would collapse, and there would be a dramatic shortfall in the tax dollars actually collected by the government. Market liquidity would decline, bid–offer spreads would widen, and all investors would pay significantly higher costs on their trades.

=== Criticism from Irene Aldridge ===
On December 21, 2009, a financial industry representative, a managing partner at a New-York-based hedge fund and an author of a book on high-frequency trading, Irene Aldridge, argued that a financial transaction tax proposed in the US would lead to job losses in non-financial sectors of the economy through the so-called multiplier effect forwarding in a magnified form any taxes imposed on Wall Street employees through their reduced demand to their suppliers and supporting industries:

100 financial security jobs are estimated to support 27 to 37 jobs in the retail sector, 72 to 91 jobs in the business services sector (think staples and copy machines), 79 to 112 jobs in the services sector (like dentists, nurses and gas station operators), and 5 to 12 restaurant and pub workers. Even the smallest FTT that reduces transaction volume by as little as 10% will, according to Schwabish, result in the loss of over 30,000 jobs just in NYC.

According to Irene Aldridge, there is also concern about the reduced return on investment for individuals, the higher spreads and volatility in the market, and possible increased banking fees, which will need to be increased in order for banks to cover the higher risk associated with holding stocks, all of which will have detrimental effects on the "main street".

== Another bill introduced by DeFazio ==
Another bill, which remains a proposal, was tabled by DeFazio on February 13, 2010. It is called "H.R.1068 - Let Wall Street Pay for Wall Street's Bailout Act of 2009."

== See also ==
- 2008 financial crisis
- Financial transaction tax
- Financial Crisis Responsibility Fee
- Peter DeFazio
- Tobin tax
