= Bank tax =

Type of tax

A bank tax, or a bank levy, is a tax on banks which was discussed in the context of the 2008 financial crisis. The bank tax is levied on the capital at risk of financial institutions, excluding federally insured deposits, with the aim of discouraging banks from taking unnecessary risks. The bank tax is levied on a limited number of sophisticated taxpayers and is not especially difficult to understand. It can be used as a counterbalance to the various ways in which banks are currently subsidized by the tax system, such as the ability to subtract bad loan reserves, delay tax on interest received abroad, and buy other banks and use their losses to offset future income. In other words, the bank tax is a small reimbursement of taxpayer funds used to bailout major banks after the 2008 financial crisis, and it is carefully structured to target only certain institutions that are considered "too big to fail."

On 16 April 2010, the International Monetary Fund (IMF) put forward three possible options to deal with the crisis, which were presented in response to an earlier request of the G20 leaders, at the September 2009 G20 Pittsburgh summit, for an investigative report on options to deal with the crisis. The IMF opted in favour of the "financial stability contribution" (FSC) option, which many media have referred to as a "bank tax". Both before and after that IMF report, there was considerable debate among national leaders as to whether such a "bank tax" should be global or semi-global, or whether it should be applied only in certain nations.

== History ==
In the context of the 2008 financial crisis, in August 2009, British Financial Services Authority chairman Lord Adair Turner said in Prospect magazine that he would be happy to consider a "tax on banks" to prevent excessive bonus payments.

=== IMF responds to G20 request ===
When the IMF presented its interim report for the G20 on April 16, 2010, it set out three options, each of which is distinct from another:

==== Financial stability contribution (FSC) ====
Financial stability contribution (FSC) – a tax on a financial institution's balance sheet (most probably on its liabilities or possibly on assets) whose proceeds would most likely be used to create an insurance fund to bail out the industry in any future crisis rather than making taxpayers pay for bailouts.

Much of the IMF's report is devoted to the first option of a levy on all major financial institutions balance sheets. Initially it could be imposed at a flat rate and later it could be refined so that the institutions with the most risky portfolios would pay more than those who took on fewer risks.

The levy could be modeled on US President Obama's proposed Financial Crisis Responsibility Fee to raise US$90 billion over 10 years from US banks with assets of more than US$50 billion. If Obama's proposal had passed, the proceeds would have gone into general government revenues. They would have been used to pay the costs of the 2008 crisis rather than gone into an insurance fund in anticipation of the next one.

==== Financial activities tax (FAT) ====
A financial activities tax (FAT) – a tax on the sum of bank profits and bankers’ remuneration packages with the proceeds going into general government revenues.

==== Financial transaction tax (FTT) ====
A financial transactions tax (FTT) – a tax on a broad range of financial instruments including stocks, bonds, currencies and derivatives.

In November 2009, two months after the G20 Pittsburgh summit, G20 national Finance Ministers met in Scotland to address the 2008 financial crisis, but were unwilling to endorse the German proposal for a financial transactions tax:

"European Union leaders urged the International Monetary Fund on Friday to consider a global tax on financial transactions in spite of opposition from the US and doubts at the IMF itself. In a communiqué issued after a two-day summit, the EU’s 27 national leaders stopped short of making a formal appeal for the introduction of a so-called "Tobin tax" but made clear they regarded it as a potentially useful revenue-raising instrument."

While the IMF does not endorse an FTT, it concedes that "The FTT should not be dismissed on grounds of administrative practicality."

==== Difference between a bank tax and a financial transactions tax ====
A "bank tax" ("bank levy") differs from a financial transaction tax in the following way:

A financial transaction tax is a tax on a specific type (or types) of financial transaction for a specific purpose (or purposes). This term has been most commonly associated with the financial sector, as opposed to consumption taxes paid by consumers. However, it is not a tax on the financial institution itself. Instead, it is charged only on the specific transactions that are designated as taxable. If an institution never carries out the taxable transaction, then it will never be taxed on that transaction. Furthermore, if it carries out only one such transaction, then it will only be taxed for that one transaction. As such, this tax is neither a financial activities tax (FAT), nor a financial stability contribution (FSC) (or "bank tax"), for example. This clarification is important in discussions about using a financial transaction tax as a tool to selectively discourage excessive speculation without discouraging any other activity (as Keynes originally envisioned it in 1936.)

== Aftermath to IMF report ==
On June 27, 2010 at the 2010 G20 Toronto summit, the G20 leaders declared that a "global tax" was no longer "on the table," but that individual countries will be able to decide whether to implement a levy against financial institutions to recoup billions of dollars in taxpayer-funded bailouts.

Nevertheless, Britain, France and Germany had already agreed before the summit to impose a "bank tax." On May 20, 2010, German officials were understood to favour a financial transaction tax over a financial activities tax.

=== Two simultaneous taxes considered in the European Union ===
On June 28, 2010, the European Union's executive said it will study whether the European Union should go alone in imposing a tax on financial transactions after G20 leaders failed to agree on the issue.

The financial transactions tax would be separate from a bank levy, or a resolution levy, which some governments are also proposing to impose on banks to insure them against the costs of any future bailouts. EU leaders instructed their finance ministers in May 2010 to work out by the end of October 2010, details for the banking levy, but any financial transaction tax remains much more controversial.

== Country-by-Country report on European OECD countries which implemented bank tax ==
The global debate about whether and how taxation should be used to stabilize the financial sector and raise revenue to partly cover the costs associated with future crises was sparked by the 2008 financial crisis.

To European OECD countries which implemented bank taxes belong Austria, Belgium, France, Greece, Hungary, Iceland, the Netherlands, Poland, Portugal, Slovenia, Sweden, and the United Kingdom. Of all these countries, which implemented the levy after the 2008 financial crisis, Greece is the only exception, in that Greece implemented the bank levy in 1975. The majority of countries base their bank tax on a measurement of liabilities or assets. Some countries, however, have chosen a different tax base.

=== Financial stability contributions as of 2021 ===
In 2011 the bank tax was implemented in Austria and based on a measure of total liabilities net of equity and insured deposits. Tax is rated between 0.024% - 0.029%.

In case of Belgium, the bank tax is measured on various tax bases depending on the size of institution, risk, and destination of tax payments. It was implemented in 2012 and the tax rates are varying.

France implemented the bank tax in 2011 and taxes the minimal amount of capital required to meet the regulatory requirements. Tax rate is 0.0642%.

Greece presents an exception, in that the bank levy was implemented before the 2008 financial crisis, in 1975. The value of the credit portfolio is taxed with the tax rate 0.12%-0.60%.

In 2010 the bank tax was implemented in Hungary, levied on a measure of assets net of interbank loans, with tax rate 0.15%-0.20%.

Iceland implemented the bank tax in 2011 and tax is levied on total debt with tax rate of 0.145%.

The tax rate in the Netherlands ranges from 0.033% to 0.066% and taxes the total amount of liabilities net of equity and insured deposits. The tax went into effect in 2012.

Poland represents another of the exception, in that the bank tax was implemented in 2016. Tax rate is 0.44% and is levied on a total value of assets.

Portugal levies the bank tax on various bases with tax rates ranging from 0.01% to 0.11%. The tax went into effect in 2011.

Slovenia levies the bank tax on a measure of total assets and has a tax rate equal to 0.10%. The tax was implemented in 2011.

The bank tax in Sweden was implemented in 2015 and taxes the total amount of liabilities net of equity and insured deposits with tax rate of 0.05%.

In case of the United Kingdom the tax rate ranges from 0.05% to 0.10% and taxes the total amount of liabilities net of insured deposits. The tax went into effect in 2011.

=== Special cases ===
==== Latvia ====
The bank tax was implemented in Latvia in 2011 and was levied on a measure of assets with tax rate equal to 0.1%. However, Latvia's bank levy was abolished in 2020.

==== Slovakia ====
In 2012, the Slovak financial stability contribution, also known as the bank levy, was enacted in order to provide a protection against possible financial crises. By the end of 2020, the tax on bank liabilities after deducting basic capital was due to expire. Despite this, Slovak lawmakers voted in November 2019 to prolong the tax indefinitely and increase the rate from 0.2 percent to 0.4 percent. Both the National Slovak Bank and the European Central Bank criticized that plan. The central bank, in its financial stability report published in November 2019, forecasted that the higher tax would reduce bank income by 33%. Slovakia's bank levy was abolished in January 2021.

However, while still in effect the Covid-19 pandemic stroke and policymakers in Slovakia were attempting to reduce bank taxes in order to provide more financial support to enterprises and public-sector investment programs. In return for lenders' assistance in funding the country's economic recovery from the pandemic, the Slovak government approved the removal of a special tax on bank deposits. Banks agreed to provide annual credit funding increases of 500 million euros for state investment projects and 1 billion euros for corporate and individual loans.

== Controversies ==
=== Should the bank tax be global? ===
On August 30, 2009, British Financial Services Authority chairman Lord Adair Turner had said it was "ridiculous" to think he would propose a new tax on London and not the rest of the world. However, in May, and June 2010, the government of Canada expressed opposition to the bank tax becoming "global" in nature.

=== Controversy over the IMF's refusal to promote a financial transactions tax ===
In a detailed analysis of the IMF's proposals, Stephan Schulmeister of the Austrian Institute of Economic Research finds that, "the assertion of the IMF paper, that [a financial-transactions tax] ‘is not focused on the core sources of financial instability,’ does not seem to have a solid foundation in the empirical evidence." Yet at least one independent commentator has endorsed the IMF's view.

In an alternative critique of the IMF's stance, Aldo Caliari of U.S. NGO the Center of Concern said, "the naiveté with which the IMF approaches its preferred mechanism — a bank tax tied to systemic risks — is astonishing for such a knowledgeable institution, unless it is in fact designed to let the financial sector off the hook." He argues that the FAT and FSC do not reduce the overall risk in the system, and may increase it if banks are encouraged to feel that the taxes provide a government guarantee of future bailouts. Nonetheless, a 2010 Tulane Law Review article lent lukewarm support to President Obama's Financial Crisis Responsibility Fee, which is a "bank tax" similar to the FSC. The Tulane article concluded that taxing financial transactions would be "foolish", and that a bank tax "could constitute shrewd regulatory reform if done properly."

== Who pays the bank tax? ==
The issue of tax incidence is discussed since it is unclear who bears the burden of bank taxation. However, an increase in taxes will increase borrowing rates for businesses and creditors without reducing bank income if banks are able to pass their taxes on to their customers. This would be counter to policymakers' goals of taxing banks to recoup bailout costs linked to the crisis, as well as taxing banks' economic rents due to potential implicit bailout guarantees.

== See also ==
- Financial Crisis Responsibility Fee
- Bank
- Capital levy
- Currency transaction tax
- Financial transaction tax
- List of G-20 summits
- Robin Hood tax
- Spahn tax
- Tax
- Tobin tax
- Transfer tax
