= International Institute of Public Finance =

Global organization of economists

The International Institute of Public Finance, or IIPF, is a global organization of economists specializing in public finance. It was founded in Paris in 1937.
