= Balcerowicz Plan =

1989 plan for transitioning the Polish economy to capitalism

The Balcerowicz Plan (Polish: plan Balcerowicza), also termed "Shock Therapy", was a method for rapidly transitioning from an economy based on state ownership and central planning, to a capitalist market economy. Named after the Polish minister and economist Leszek Balcerowicz, the free-market economic reforms were adopted in Poland in 1989.

A group of experts, which they formed together with Balcerowicz, including Stanisław Gomułka, Stefan Kawalec and Wojciech Misiąg, in September 1989 created a reform plan, allegedly based on an earlier idea of Jeffrey Sachs, and on 6 October, an outline of this plan was presented to the public by Balcerowicz at a press conference broadcast by TVP. There was a 3-year drop in output. Similar reforms were made in a number of countries. The plan has resulted in reduced inflation and budget deficit, while simultaneously increasing unemployment and inequality.

== Background ==
The unofficial talks (Negotiations at Magdalenka) at Magdalenka and then the Polish Round Table talks of 1989 allowed for a peaceful transition of power to the democratically elected government. Initially, it was agreed that the government would be formed by Tadeusz Mazowiecki and the opposition, while the seat of the president of Poland would be given to former Polish United Workers' Party leader Gen. Wojciech Jaruzelski.

The state of Poland's economy as of 1989 was dire. After failed social and economic reforms of 1970s the communist government had secretly declared its insolvency to Western creditors in 1981. Food price increases introduced first in 1970s to preserve the basic cash flow led to social unrest and formation of mass Solidarity social change movement which, by early 1980s had over 10 million members. Desperate attempts to maintain the Marxian-style economy and internal opposition in the Party to any economic reforms that would break this status quo led to the introduction of martial law (1981–83) which further hindered economic growth and resulted in international sanctions.

In the late 1980s, after 45 years of communist rule, Poland's economy was ineffective, paralyzed by central planning and discontent of poorly paid workers. Although there was practically no unemployment in Poland, wages were low and the shortage economy led to lack of even the most basic foodstuffs in the shops.

On the 1 of August 1989 the transition government ended the price controls for food leading to price increases. The lead to an inflation rate of 639.6% in 1990. Foreign debt reached $42 billion. The majority of state-owned monopolies and holdings were largely ineffective and completely obsolete in terms of technology.

== The plan ==
In September 1989, a commission of experts was formed under the presidency of Leszek Balcerowicz, Poland's leading economist, Minister of Finance and deputy Premier of Poland. Among the members of the commission were Jeffrey Sachs, Stanisław Gomułka, Stefan Kawalec and Wojciech Misiąg. The commission prepared a plan of extensive reforms that were to enable fast transformation of Poland's economy from "obsolete and ineffective central planning" to capitalism, as adopted by the states of Western Europe and America.

On 6 October, the program was presented on public television and in December the Sejm passed a packet of 10 acts, all of which were signed by the president on 31 December 1989. These were:

1. Act on Financial Economy Within State-owned Companies, which allowed for state-owned businesses to declare bankruptcy and ended the fiction by which companies were able to exist even if their effectiveness and accountability was close to none. Removed the guarantee of the existence of all state-owned enterprises regardless of their financial results and production efficiency, enabled the insolvency proceedings against unprofitable enterprises.
2. Act on Banking Law, which forbade financing the state budget deficit by the national central bank and forbade the issue of new currency.
3. Act on Credits, which abolished the preferential laws on credits for state-owned companies and tied interest rates to inflation.
4. Act on Taxation of Excessive Wage Rise, introducing the so-called popiwek tax limiting the wage increase in state-owned companies in order to limit hyperinflation.
5. Act on New Rules of Taxation, introducing common taxation for all companies and abolishing special taxes that could previously have been applied to private companies through means of administrative decision.
6. Act on Economic Activity of Foreign Investors, allowing foreign companies and private people to invest in Poland and export their profits abroad, exempting enterprises with foreign capital from paying popiwek tax.
7. Act on Foreign Currencies, introducing internal exchangeability of the złoty and abolishing the state monopoly in international trade.
8. Act on Customs Law, creating a uniform customs rate for all companies.
9. Act on Employment, regulating the duties of unemployment agencies. Formally sanctioning the existence of unemployment.
10. Act on Special Circumstances Under Which a Worker Could be Laid Off, protecting the workers of state firms from being fired in large numbers and guaranteeing unemployment grants and severance pay.

In late December the plan was approved by the International Monetary Fund. The IMF's support was especially important because the national debt in various foreign banks and governments reached an amount of US$42.3 billion (64,8% of GDP) in 1989. The IMF granted Poland a stabilization fund of US$1 billion and an additional stand-by credit of US$720 million. Following this, the World Bank granted Poland additional credits for modernization of exports of Polish goods and food products. Many governments followed and paid off some of the former Communist debt (about 50% of the sum of debt capital and all cumulated interest rates to 2001).

== Effects ==
Balcerowicz's policies resulted in a significant reduction of inflation and budget deficit (in 1990 a surplus), the elimination of the market deficiency and central distribution of materials, obtaining the agreement of creditors to reduce the foreign debt, and a significant increase in foreign exchange reserves. There is no consensus among experts whether the Balcerowicz plan had a direct impact on the development of entrepreneurship and trade, which had already been liberalised a year earlier by the so-called Wilczek Act, a package of market reforms implemented by Mieczysław Wilczek in 1988. An international Fund for Stabilisation of the Złoty of US$1 billion was established. The exchange rate of the złoty was frozen at 10,000 per dollar for about a year and a half. Later, the crawling peg method was used for several years. Polish złoty was heavily devaluated against the US dollar, which together with additional import levies, became a heavy contributor to inflation.

=== Privatization ===
As a result of the bankruptcies and liquidation of many state-owned enterprises and the reduction of employment in those that survived, the unemployment rate after the political transformation reached a level in the order of 16.4% in 1993. Since 1990, there has been an increase in unemployment in Poland - throughout the transformation period it has been at double-digit levels. At the beginning of the introduction of the Balcerowicz Plan (in January 1990), the unemployment rate was only 0.3%, and already in December 1990 it was 12.2%. In the next two years it rose to 16%, as a result of the continued process of liquidation of state-owned enterprises. In 2003, the unemployment rate reached as high as 20%. The drop in unemployment did not occur until after Poland's accession to the EU, when a large group of young, mostly well-educated Poles left for EU countries for work. The privatizations were carried out haphazardly and in a non-transparent way; according to Jacek Tittenburn, "Plants sold were undervalued, well-functioning factories were destroyed, factories competing with Western manufacturers were got rid of." The collapse of state-owned industries and deindustrialization made Poland's greenhouse gas emissions to fall by 28% between 1988 and 1994.

In total, 1,675 industrial plants in Poland were liquidated during the transformation, which amounted to 33% of the total country assets. Polish economist Andrzej Karpiński estimated that about 25% of these liquidations were directly planned by the government, while the remaining 75% were a result of land speculation and hostile takeovers. Karpiński estimated that in case of a strictly controlled and limited privatization process, unemployment would have been 50% lower, and national income 33% higher. Privatization was most aggressive between 1990 and 1994, and yielded underwhelming results in terms of profit. For example, a cost of privatization of 314 Polish enterprises was about US$710 million. Privatization programs involved high foreign consultancy costs, and were paid for through privatization as well as loans and grants from the World Bank and the International Monetary Fund. Because the Balcerowicz Plan involved austerity, the proceeds from privatization were not invested or allocated into development programs, but were kept in the state budget. Despite the proceeds from privatisation, Poland's foreign debt has increased during the transformation period. Hanna Brauers and Pao-Yu Oe wrote: "Less than 3% of all expenditures on restructuring programmes went to job creation in other sectors. As local authorities, which were meant to create new job opportunities, had little experience with this task and received no support, success in that respect was very limited."

=== Immediate results ===
Balcerowicz did assume that the initial effects of his reforms would be detrimental. He estimated that the national income would fall by 3% and industrial production would decline by 5%; he also assumed that about 400,000 workers would become unemployed, and that inflation would fall to a single digit in a year. However, the consequences were about five times more severe than estimated - national income fell by 22%, industrial production declined by 25%, over 3 million people became unemployed, and inflation fell to single digit only after 9 years into transformation.

Poland had a high public debt and budget deficit throughout the entire transformation period - the last positive budget balance was recorded in 1989, in the People's Republic of Poland shortly before the beginning of the Balcerowicz Plan. The plan resulted in a budget deficit through extensive trade with main foreign partners and an "avalanche" of imported goods in Poland through lack of regulation. In 1990, the negative balance of trade amounted to US$4793 million, in 2000 it already exceeded US$17000 million, and in 2010 it amounted to US$13119 million. This negative balance of trade was associated with the shortage of goods on the Polish market a well as cutting off Polish enterprises from credit, most of which were sold of to foreign capital and subsequently liquidated. According to Witold Kieżun, Polish enterprises experienced hostile takeovers by foreign capital - as the result, out of the 100 largest firms in Poland, only 17 are Polish.

=== Recession ===
In the first four months of 1990, the wage indexation factor was set at a very low level. The transformation resulted in a sharp decline in the real income of citizens. Consequently, the level of demand and, in turn, sales and production also fell. The result was an economic recession. In the first two months of the transformation, real wages decreased by more than 40%. Kołodko argues that the stabilising effect could have been achieved by a 20% reduction in real wages. In addition, the reduction in real wages was influenced by the poorly constructed 'popiwek' mechanism. In the first months of 1990, it had a significant impact on the deepening of the recession, as it excessively restricted demand. From September onwards, it also started to have a pro-inflationary effect, as wages grew without any relation to stagnant production. The excessive decline in real wages in the first months of transition was the cause of the deep downturn. Attempts to improve the situation, in mid-1990, did not bring the expected result.

The recession in the real sphere was also caused by the drastic increase in the level of interest rates from the beginning of January 1990 and their maintenance until the end of February. It was during these two months that the biggest - 30% - collapse in the real sphere took place, after which the Polish economy found itself in a state of depression. Kołodko emphasises that the phenomenon of so-called 'correlative inflation' occurred mainly in the first half of January. Later, the very high nominal interest rate, instead of having an anti-inflationary effect, began to deepen the scale of the recession. Kołodko states that the 'side effect' of the transformation process in the form of a deep recession must be assessed in a negative way, writing that "a 30% drop in industrial production would have been a very difficult cost to accept, even if the stabilisation of the economy had been unequivocally successful".

The 1990 recession was 'sterile', as it most affected enterprises producing consumer goods for households (and therefore socially desirable companies). However, the decline in production was not accompanied by the elimination of inefficient companies. The authorities did not attempt to revitalize state-owned enterprises, which were guided neither by the central plan nor by market mechanisms. Kołodko emphasises that this sector was often subject to deliberate attacks, e.g. in the form of a hard tax policy ('popiwek'). State-owned companies were discriminated against compared to private companies. State-owned enterprises were denied investment loans, regardless of their financial condition. According to Kołodko, in 1990-1991 the Polish economy was affected by the phenomenon of slumpflation, i.e. a decrease in production and an increase in unemployment was accompanied by high inflation.

=== Labor market ===
Balcerowicz Plan had long-term effect on the Polish economy, and thoroughly transformed aspects of it such as the labour market. Lost jobs were not substituted with others - replacing old socialist contracts, new job contracts were much less secure and based on economic precarity. This also resulted in the new, foreign-owned industry outperforming the old one that came from the socialist era. Socialist-era workplaces that survived the transformation had to honor their contracts with existing employees, which gave much more safety and power to the employee, but was less profitable to the company. Economists such as Jarosław Urbański also tied this to brain drain in Poland, arguing that the "new industry" led by foreign capital is locating assembly plants, rather than research or development centres, in Poland, offering non-innovative jobs.

The capitalist transformation also led to a massive collapse of large factories in Poland and their replacement with small ones. In 1989, 3.2 million Poles worked in large factories - by 2010s, this figure dropped to 640,000. The economic share of large industrial enterprises is less than in developed countries. In an average developed country, the share of large industrial enterprises is over one-third percent, while in case of Poland it is about 20%. This lack of large enterprises made Polish economy on importing technology from abroad, and is also considered a factor in stifling innovation and brain drain.

A factor also considered an effect of the transformation that contributed to brain drain are low wages, that continue to persist in Poland. Marianna Księżyk wrote in 2013: "The assurances of economists carrying out the market-oriented transformation about Poland's rapid development and society's glorious capitalist future have not come true. Poland is not a country of high economic growth and, moreover, it does not translate into an increase in the standard of living of the general population, as shown by the wages of Polish workers in comparison with other countries and the percentage of the population living in relative poverty. According to the Central Statistical Office (CSO), the relative poverty indicator defines the minimum subsistence level determined (monthly) by the amount of PLN 466 in a one-person household and PLN 1257 in a four-person household." Księżyk notes that the Balcerowicz Plan and low wages that came through it caused the phenomenon of "working poor" in Poland - people who receive the Polish minimum wage, which is among the lowest in the EU. While the Committee of Experts of the Council of Europe considers 68% of the average national wage a fair wage, the minimum wage never exceeded 40% in Poland throughout the transformation period. It was not until 2005 that the level of average gross salaries from 1980 was reached.

=== Social wealth ===
The main negative effect of Balcerowicz Plan was the stratification of society. This trend was not even halted by the accelerated development of the economy between 1995 and 1997, and the decline in the rate of economic growth in the following years contributed to the further deterioration of the economic situation of Polish households. According to research by Elżbieta Mikuła, in 2000 the income of the wealthiest group of households accounted for 121% of the income in employee households and was 2.5 times higher than that of the poorest group. The withdrawal of the state from its socialist-era welfare functions, as well as increasing social and economic disparities resulted in a sharp increase in the number of socially marginalised families. According to GINI index, wealth inequality in Poland - in 1989, the GINI index for Poland was 26.9, which then rose to 32.7 in 1996 and 35.9 in 2006. This trend continued, and between 2005 and 2006 alone, the wealthiest 100 Poles increased their wealth from 18.5% to 53.7%. According to Irma Allen, "Polish disparities of income have been found to be the highest in the Central and East European region and far higher than in the majority of European states". This point was also emphasized by Jan Sowa:

Between 1989 and 1995, the gini coefficient in Poland rose from 0.28 to 0.38. This is a huge leap, and most probably the financial disparities in Polish society are wider than the official data shows. This means that there was no such thing as an “overall social cost of the transformation” understood as sacrifices borne by everyone. A certain sector of society, so-called winners, gained from the transformation, while another sector lost. The latter were the transformation losers. The winners did not necessarily make any sacrifices; the share of income reaching the top 10% of society steadily increased over the period, rising from 22% to 33%.

In 2005, the Federation for Social Reintegration estimated that the so-called old poverty (about 1,000,000 families nationwide, marginalised and affected by social pathology for many generations) had been joined by more than 1,500,000 families of the so-called new poverty, i.e. people whose life situation had dramatically deteriorated as a result of capitalist transformation implemented by Balcerowicz. From January 1990 to December 1994, unemployment rose steadily from 0.3% to 16%. In the following years, however, this trend was reversed and by December 1998 the unemployment rate had been reduced to 10.4%, but by January 2004 it had risen to 20.6%. According to Marianna Księżyk, the percentage of Polish population living in poverty steadily rose in the 1990s and reached 17.1% by 2000; this percentage flunctuated in the 2000s between 17 and 20%, and by 2010 it was back to 17.1%.

According to Polish political scientist Michał Sutowski, the defining effect of Balcerowicz Plan was pauperisation of the budgetary sphere, especially the spheres such as health and education. Austerity at the expense of administration and public services that defined the reform led to the pauperisation of the ‘middle class of the public sector’. In short term, it caused reduction of the public money pool through loss of revenues (unpaid taxes and duties); in the medium term, it became an impulse for privatisation and differentiation of society according to the wealth. In the long term, according to Sutowski, "it is another brick in the wall of contempt for the state and the sphere of the public good, portrayed as a hotbed of incompetence, entitlement and vested interests inhibiting capitalist modernisation." Sutowski sums up: "In one government report on the subject, we can read that parents finance the operation of public education to the tune of 17 per cent, e.g. by bringing coal to schools; teachers have had their already meagre salaries cut. Customs officers received an incentive allowance of about one salary for detecting an attempt at large-scale smuggling. Doctors only went on strike for civilised salaries in the late 1990s, and nurses are still fighting for them today, even though thirty years have passed."

Writing on the effects of the shock therapy, Irma Kinga Allen wrote that "suicide rates rocketed – especially among men"; between 1989 and 1992, suicide rates in Poland rose by 24%, and men were five times more likely to die by suicide than women. Despite the participation of the Solidarność trade union, the collective strength of the workers was eroded in Poland - workers' council in privatized companies were dissolved. While in 1980 trade union membership had 65% density, it fell to 16% by the 21st century. Between 1990 and 2008, Polish trade unions lost 70% of their members. Allen also argues that the Balcerowicz Plan pawed the way for success of right-wing populism in 2000s Poland: "The rise of austerity economics and financialization, the shrinking of social security, the decline of living standards, intensifying social inequalities, the offshoring of manufacturing and traditional workingclass jobs in uneven processes of deindustrialization, the reduced political capital of disenfranchised workers, increases in labour mobility and hyper-individualization, and the increased power of transnational corporations vis-a-vis declining state power, coupled with the decline of the traditional Left, has created widespread disenchantment, anger and a political vacuum that the far-right has filled.

== Assessment ==
=== Positive ===
The strongest defender of the plan was Leszek Balcerowicz himself, who in 1992 argued that his reforms resulted in an increase in the supply of goods, privatisation of trade, internal convertibility of the złoty, rapid growth in exports, effective introduction of market economy principles, development of financial institutions such as banks and the Stock Exchange, establishment of 'genuine local government', reform of the tax system, and reduction of foreign debt. He believed that setbacks that his reforms suffered were caused by factors that slowed down the privatization. Decades after the plan, Balcerowicz argued that Polish economy remains too regulated and his reforms should be continued, writing: "I think we have an optimal situation in terms of price stability and currency convertibility. [...] As far as the overall state of the economy is concerned, when comparing the current situation with the starting point, we must note enormous positive changes. However, we still have public spending that is far too high, reaching 47% of GDP. As a result, we have high taxes and, in addition, a huge budget deficit. Public finances are in poor health, which is one of the symptoms of the Polish political system's illness. […] Another problem we have to deal with is the excessive legal regulation of certain areas of the economy. […] In almost every sector, production is based on employment contracts. When regulations in this area are too strict and flawed, the entire economy suffers."

A defender of the plan was also Wacław Wilczyński, who credited the plan with rapid privatization, inflation reduction, cancellation of foreign debt, high growth rate, and the adoption of a new, democratic constitution of Poland. He believed that the reforms increased the standard of living of Poles, noting a sharp increase in demand for housing and cars. He believed that complains of low wages in Poland are unjustified, attributing them to education gap that must be overcome. He dismissed the accusations of excessive foreign capital participation in the banking sector, stating that the benefits of these banks to the economy outweighed the risks. He wrote that while the plan failed to increase the low level of social capital in Poland, this was the fault of populist and left-leaning governments that halted privatization and were "stopping the transformation halfway".

Positive evaluation of Balcerowicz's reforms was also written by Stanisław Gomułka. According to Gomułka, the main success of the plan was that since 1992, Poland had not experienced an economy-wide scale recession nor a banking crisis. He called a claim that the plan was too focused on curbing inflation while ignoring social costs "a myth", stating that it took 12 years to lower annual inflation from 250% in 1990 to below 10%. He also argued that the plan did not result in "an extremely large" decline in real wages, stating that this view "ignores the excessive increase in average real wages" in socialist Poland, which brought them up to an unsustainable level. He counters claims of privatization being too hasty with by stating that privatization in Poland did not go far enough, criticizing post-Balcerowicz governments of rejecting any kind of a mass voucher privatization program and enacting regulation on privatization. Gomułka also believed that the plan was crucial to a successful introduction of liberal democracy in Poland.

Polish economists W. Jarmołowicz and K. Szarzec argued in their study of the economic transformations that there were many more 'bright spots' than 'shadows' in the Polish transformation in the areas of macroeconomic stabilization, microeconomic liberalization and privatization. They praised the plan for working on the assumption that 'economic freedom and the rule of law are essential conditions for long-term economic growth,' and stated that while the plan had flaws, no economic theory was able to provide guidance on how to transform the economy, forcing Balcerowicz to learn from mistakes. Szarzec and Jarmołowicz argue that the plan was successful in suppressing inflation, cutting deficit and returning Poland to a path of a rapid GPD growth. Among the flaws they listed excessive budget deficit, high unemployment rate and state of public finances. They believed that these could be alleviated by increasing the freedom to conduct business in Poland.

Zdzisław Sadowski, a longtime president of the Polish Economist Society, spoke positively of the economic transformation, writing that "the changes that took place so quickly were an undoubted success, and in the following years the transformation process brought many positive changes in economic life and social conditions". He did note mistakes of the plan as well, which he listed as corruption in the privatisation of state-owned enterprises, disregard for the law, and waste of public funds. He considered the privatization of banking and insurance sectors to be Balcerowicz's greatest mistakes, along with mass unemployment and an emergence of large-scale social exclusion and poverty. He claimed that Balcerowicz was not liberal enough, creating a hybrid of interventionism and free market instead of fully embracing the 'Anglo-Saxon model', which Sadowski considered superior in terms of social benefits.

Ryszard Bugaj argued that the Balcerowicz Plan should be seen as a success. He noted, however, that the transformation was not a complete success, stating that in contrast to other supporters, he considers the pace of economic growth unimpressive. Bugaj stated that the economic development was largely financed through by national assets, which required numerous industries to be "effectively liquidated" or relegated into becoming "peripheral parts of foreign corporations". He also expressed concern about the rapid growth of inequality which resulted in "social conflict", low social capital, persistently high unemployment, and institutional weakness of welfare state in Poland. However, he concluded that there was no alternative to Balcerowicz Plan, and the only reasonable path would be to consider 'adjustments' to the plan instead of rejecting it altogether.

=== Negative ===
The Balcerowicz plan has been criticised for having contributed to a significant decline in the living wage of numerous groups of the population, especially workers in unprofitable state-owned enterprises and the state agricultural farms, creating poverty areas and structural unemployment, which in many places continues to this day. Some economists also criticized the Balcerowicz plan for insufficiently protecting the internal market during the transition and of allowing entire sectors of the economy to collapse for many years as a result of the lack of a state policy to influence its structure.

Among the most frequently criticised (mainly by Grzegorz Kołodko) elements accompanying the introduction of the plan include:

- The Act on the Ordering of Credit Relations (of December 1989), by which the 'inflationary overhang' was to be taken off the market. Repealed the provisions of credit agreements concerning privileges and preferences in access to credit and their interest rates below inflation. It introduced 'variable' interest rate thresholds instead of contractual ones (in already concluded credit agreements) - as a result, in the conditions of existing hyperinflation, banks multiplied their claims on borrowers overnight.
- The maintenance for a period of several months (January 1990 - May 1991) of a fixed dollar exchange rate (9,500 zlotys per dollar) - the so-called anti-inflationary anchor. A side effect was a decrease in the purchasing power of savings and debts in dollars and the possibility for foreign investors to profit from high interest rates on savings in zlotys (limited by foreign exchange law and the currency liquidity of the economy).

According to some economists, in the 1990s the plan led to a collapse of domestic demand, flooding the domestic market with imported production, as well as the collapse of state enterprises indebted by financial policy and the sale of the best of them into the hands of mainly Western capital. It also led to a strong pauperisation of the majority of the population and a spike in unemployment. The plan's most decisive effect for generations was to create the possibility of privatising state assets in the Latin American formula in the form of selling off, to the point of economic partition, enclaves of modernity and profitability to foreign corporations for 4.5-5% of their replacement value. According to Kołodko, a mistake of the Balcerowicz's stabilisation package was the assumption of a rapid increase in supply from enterprises. Balcerowicz believed that production would recover on its own, without interference from economic policy. However, the low elasticity of business supply and the shock reduction in domestic demand resulted in a price-maximising response which, in the reality of moving away from a shortage economy, encountered a barrier to effective demand. There was therefore a drastic decline in production. Interventionism was attempted late, and in the period of the 'systemic void', monetary and fiscal policy instruments worked differently than in a properly formed market economy. According to G. Kołodko, the Polish economy underwent a process of 'over-liberalization'.

The course of the transformation was most severely criticised by Kazimierz Z. Poznański, doctor of economics. He condemned the selling off of national assets to foreign capital, which according to him was sold for only 9 to 12% of their real value. Poznański states that it deprived the economy of profits and made it only an income from labour - while communism had expropriated foreign capital, the capitalist transformation under Balcerowicz had fully enfranchised foreign subjects, "removing any hope of the emergence of a capitalist class of their own, and of citizens receiving income from capital sold to foreigners". Poznański also criticised excessive concessions to the European Union, including the liberalisation of foreign trade. According to his calculations, in 1996 Poland had reached the level of the economy in 1989 and the level of national income in 1976. He wrote that by reducing the role of the state, the Balcerowicz Plan made it impossible to control the national economy, resulting in the outflow of profits abroad, which failed to increase labour productivity or introduce modern technology.

Tadeusz Kowalik contended that Balcerowicz did not have a coherent programme, and acted under the dictates of Jeffrey Sachs and other Western advisers. To Kowalik, the excessive social costs of the transformation resulted in the 'ugly face of Polish transformation', manifesting itself in the form of high and persistent unemployment, impoverishment of the countryside, a wide area of poverty and high, ever-growing social inequalities, a crisis of the welfare state visible in the degradation of social security. Kowalik argued that privatisation benefited the few who firmly held the once chosen course of transformation, and that what emerged was "a market economy that did not suit the majority of Polish society". Kowalik believed that a social democratic model would have been the best for Poland, contrasting it with Balcerowicz Plan that was "colossally overdone".

Kowalik is particularly critical of the thesis that the Balcerowicz Plan was the only good solution. He Kowalik argues that an excellent basis for the transformation policy could have been the Round Table Agreements. He also spoke against comparing Polish economic performance to that of other countries such as Ukraine or Russia, writing that given that Poland had much better initial economic conditions (e.g. a relatively developed private sector), Balcerowicz Plan should not be considered a success. Kowalik emphasises that Balcerowicz squandered a unique opportunity to create the foundations of a fair socio-economic system. Instead, a system was created "whose trademarks became mass and permanent unemployment, for many years the highest in Central Europe and then the highest in the EU; one of the highest income disparities; the dismantling of the welfare state. Added to this was the breaking down of workers' negotiating power. The shock operation meant consenting to the introduction into Poland of the worst variety of capitalism."

In his 2025 analysis of the economic transformation and its effects on Polish economy and society, Jan Sowa concluded:

What happened during the transformation can be summed up by a well-known joke: the operation was successful, but the patient died. […] Still in 2000, Poland had a two-digit inflation rate (10.1%), although it was the fight against inflation that was one of the main objectives of the reforms. The socioeconomic costs of the reforms were exorbitant. Kowalik enumerates the most important of these in the "Introduction" to his book: in the decade and a half after 1990, 5 million jobs disappeared in Poland, the employment rate dropped from 80% to 54%, the unemployment rate was rising until the early 2000s (with a slight decline between 1994–97) and at its peak (early 2003) it was over 20%. In other words, more than 3 million people were jobless, while government projections at the end of 1989 assumed that a maximum of 400,000 people would be affected by unemployment, and the hardships would take 1–2 years. In the early 2000s, Poland had the highest unemployment rate among young people (35–40%) and at the same time the lowest social benefits in the OECD countries.

It is also worth emphasizing one important point, to which Kowalik devotes an entire chapter in his book: there was an alternative to the radical solutions that the Polish government chose in 1989. This included not only the ideas developed by Solidarity in the 1980s, but also the expertise of Swedish economists and at least two concepts for reforming the socialist economy, one proposed by Włodzimierz Brus and Kazimierz Łaski, the other by the Hungarian economist János Kornai. The fundamentalist market-driven transformation of the Polish economy, later dubbed a "shock doctrine," was basically a copy of neoliberal solutions developed by Jeffrey Sachs and David Lipton, while its introduction was championed by global financial institutions (the International Monetary Fund and the World Bank), but the course of the reforms was ultimately decided by the government of Tadeusz Mazowiecki, supported discursively by liberal circles associated with GW, and it is them who bear responsibility for their dire social consequences.

Karol Modzelewski, a former Solidarity leader, wrote of the plan: "freedom is a value for all, which does not mean that in the social dimension freedom has to be so dramatically bought with economic inequality. We have a peculiar current of thought, or rather a current of platitudes, according to which the only thing that matters is the efficiency of the free market, so we should not look at those who find themselves in the sphere of social collapse. At the threshold of the Third Republic of Poland, much was said in liberal circles about the development of the Polish middle class. Meanwhile, an upper class and a much lower class emerged, somewhat like in the Latin American countries." He wrote that "it was not just a case of IMF imposition of its will - ‘Leszek Balcerowicz’s team did not resist at all. On the contrary, of their own free will, they chose the most radical version of the so-called stabilization policy, which the IMF representatives treated only as a version of the tender." Witold Kieżun wrote similarly of the plan, arguing that instead of creating a team of professionals made up of Polish professors working at Western universities, "it was decided to do the transformation under the dictates of a young, inexperienced American, Jeffrey Sachs, and a few capitalistically indoctrinated party academics". He concluded that "the direction taken then has determined the structure of the Polish economy to this day. Big industry and trade dominated by foreign capital. Likewise the banks."

In case of foreign analyses, Chris Hann wrote: "No one can doubt that the processes of transition in the Visegrád states would have been very different if they had been launched in the 1960s under the aegis of Keynesianism and the Marshall Plan, rather than in the 1990s, when militant neoliberalism was in the ascendant." He states that Latin America and Eastern Europe became living laboratories for neoliberalism, and that in Eastern Europe shock therapies resulted in 'capitalism devoid of any of the social protections that were the achievement of social movements in Western European capitalism', a capitalism "more American" than that of Western Europe or United States itself. John Feffer argued that "the refusal to consider a Marshall Plan after 1989 in favour of a repeat of the ruinous policies of 1918 is a testament to the failure of institutional memory and the victory of theory (or greed) over demonstrable practice.

== Comparative statistics ==
Finland has been included in the tables as a reference point. It is a country whose economy was oriented towards trade with the USSR, but at the same time did not require a costly systemic transformation. The impact of the external shock of the collapse of the USSR economy can be estimated using this example.

Dynamics of GDP (according to PPP in USD) in selected countries - "GGDC"

| Year | Poland | Hungary | Czech Republic | Russia | Ukraine | Belarus | Finland |
|---|---|---|---|---|---|---|---|
| 1990 | −9,68% | −6,67% | −1,20% | −3,00% | −3,60% | −1,90% | +0,01% |
| 1991 | −7,02% | −11,90% | −11,61% | −5,00% | −8,70% | −1,40% | −6,39% |
| 1992 | +2,51% | −3,06% | −0,51% | −14,50% | −9,90% | −9,60% | −3,81% |
| 1993 | +3,74% | −0,58% | +0,06% | −8,70% | −14,20% | −7,60% | −1,24% |
| 1994 | +5,29% | +2,95% | +2,22% | −12,70% | −22,90% | −11,70% | +3,94% |
| 1995 | +6,95% | +1,49% | +5,94% | −4,10% | −12,20% | −10,40% | +3,45% |
| 1996 | +6,00% | +1,32% | +4,16% | −3,60% | −10,00% | +2,80% | +3,79% |
| 1990–96 | +6,61% | −16,11% | −1,94% | −41,94% | −58,55% | −34,29% | −0,75% |

Inflation at the end of year in selected countries

| Year | Poland | Czech Republic | Slovakia | Hungary | Bulgaria | Romania |
|---|---|---|---|---|---|---|
| 1989 | 640,0% | 1,5% | 1,5% | 18,9% | 10,0% | 0,6% |
| 1990 | 249,0% | 18,4% | 18,4% | 33,4% | 72,5% | 37,6% |
| 1991 | 60,4% | 52,0% | 58,3% | 32,2% | 339,0% | 222,8% |
| 1992 | 44,3% | 12,7% | 9,2% | 21,6% | 79,0% | 199,2% |
| 1993 | 37,6% | 18,2% | 24,8% | 21,1% | 64,0% | 295,5% |

Dynamics of employees number in selected countries - "GGDC"

| Period | Poland | Hungary | Czech Republic | Russia | Ukraine | Belarus | Finland |
|---|---|---|---|---|---|---|---|
| 1990–96 | −15,3% | −26,2% | −10,2% | −12,3% | −8,4% | −16,1% | −16,4% |

Unemployment rate in selected countries

| Year | Poland | Hungary | Czech Republic | Slovakia | Bulgaria | Finland |
|---|---|---|---|---|---|---|
| 1991 | 12,2% | 6,1% | 3,8% | 9,6% | 8,5% | 6,6% |
| 1992 | 14,3% | 11,8% | 2,6% | 10,6% | 14,3% | 11,7% |
| 1993 | 16,4% | 12,9% | 3,2% | 13,9% | 15,7% | 16,3% |
| 1994 | 16,0% | 10,9% | 3,2% | 14,5% | 13,4% | 16,6% |
| 1995 | 14,9% | 10,9% | 3,1% | 14,8% | 14,1% | 15,4% |

== See also ==
- Revolutions of 1989
- Deindustrialisation of Poland
- Structural adjustment
- Washington Consensus
- Hungarian Bokros package
- New Zealand Ruthanasia
