= Index of Japan-related articles (B) =

This page lists Japan-related articles with romanized titles beginning with the letter B. For names of people, please list by surname (i.e., "Tarō Yamada" should be listed under "Y", not "T"). Please also ignore particles (e.g. "a", "an", "the") when listing articles (i.e., "A City with No People" should be listed under "City").

== B ==
- B'z

== Ba ==
- Baby and Me
- Babymetal
- Babymetal (album)
- Baby, The Stars Shine Bright
- Badi (magazine)
- Badtz-maru
- Bahamut Lagoon
- Baka (fool)
- Bake-danuki
- Baku (spirit)
- Bakuryuuha
- Bakusho Mondai
- Balrog (video game character)
- Bandai
- Band-Maid
- Bangai-O
- Banjo-Kazooie
- Banjo-Tooie
- Bank of Japan
- Barazoku
- Burdock
- Baseball Stars
- Battabara
- Battle of Anegawa
- Battle Angel Alita
- Battle of Iwo Jima
- Battle of Khalkhin Gol
- Battle of Leyte Gulf
- Battle of Midway
- Battle of Mikatagahara
- Battle of Mimasetoge
- Battle of Nagakute
- Battle of Nagashino
- Battle of Okehazama
- Battle of Okinawa
- Battle of Peleliu
- Battle of Sekigahara
- Battle of the Coral Sea
- Battle of the Java Sea
- Battle of the Planets
- Battle of Shizugatake
- Battle of Tedorigawa
- Battle of the Eastern Solomons
- Battle of Tsushima
- Battle of Uchidehama
- Battle of Yalu River (1894)
- Battle of Yalu River (1904)
- Battle Royale
- Battles of Bunroku and Keicho
- Battles of Kawanakajima
- Batto-jutsu

== Be ==
- Bean jam
- Beatmania
- Beautiful Dreamer (film)
- Beautiful Life (Japanese TV series)
- BEE Japan
- Christopher Belton
- Bento
- Benzaiten
- Beppu, Ōita
- Berserk
- Betamax
- Beyblade

== Bi ==
- The Big O
- Big the Cat
- Bingo Province
- Bibai
- Bisai
- Bisei, Okayama
- Bishōnen
- Bishōjo
- Bitchū Province
- Bitchu, Okayama
- Biwa, Shiga
- Bizen Province
- Bizen, Okayama

== Bl ==
- Black Cat (manga)
- Black Rain
- The Black Ships
- Black Thunder (chocolate bar)
- Blackjack (manga)
- Blazing Transfer Student
- Blood: The Last Vampire
- Blue (2001 film)
- Blue Gender

== Bo ==
- Bō
- BoA
- Bob Sapp
- Bodaiji
- Bōgu
- Bōjutsu
- Bokeh
- Bokken
- Bokkun
- Bombardment of Shimonoseki
- Bombing of Tokyo in World War II
- Bon Festival
- Bon Odori
- Bones (studio)
- Bonotsu, Kagoshima
- Bonsai
- Boogiepop series
- Boogiepop Phantom
- The Book of Five Rings
- The Boom
- Bōryokudan
- Boshin War
- Bōsōzoku
- Botchan
- Bow-Lingual
- Bowser (Nintendo)
- Bowser Jr.
- Boys Be

== Br ==
- Bra (dragonball)
- Branded to Kill
- Brand New Maid
- Brave Fencer Musashi
- Brazilian Jiu Jitsu
- Breath of Fire
- Bridgestone
- Bright Future
- Bright Noa
- Brown rice
- Jules Brunet

== Bs ==
- BS The Legend of Zelda
- BS Zelda no Densetsu Inishie no Sekiban

== Bu ==
- Bubble Bobble
- Bubblegum Crash
- Bubblegum Crisis
- Bubblegum Crisis Tokyo 2040
- Buddhahood
- Buddhism
- Buddhism in Japan
- Buddhist architecture in Japan
- Buddhist cuisine
- Buddhist temples in Japan
- Buddhist terms and concepts
- Budō
- Bujinkan
- Bukkake
- Bulma
- Bungo Province
- Bungotakada, Ōita
- Bunkyō, Tokyo
- Burakumin
- Bushido
- Bust-A-Move Bash!
- Bust-a-Move DS
- Bust-a-Move Millennium
- Bust-a-Move Pocket
- Bust-a-Move Universe
- Butsudan
- Butsuden
- Buyo
- Buzen Province
- Buzen, Fukuoka

== By ==
- Byōdō-in
- Byoyomi
