= 1986 Bolivian referendum =

An unofficial referendum on governmental economic policies, debt repayment and tax law was held in Bolivia on 24 July 1986. The policies were rejected by 97.9% of those who voted, although turnout was just 23%.

== Background ==
Faced with an economic crisis, the government of Víctor Paz Estenssoro attempted to solve some of the problems by passing Supreme Decree 21060, which led to layoffs, cuts in subsidies and repayment of foreign debts. As a result, the COB trade union called a general strike.

== Results ==
| Choice | Votes | % |
|---|---|---|
| For | 30,500 | 2.1 |
| Against | 1,390,000 | 97.9 |
| Invalid/blank votes | | – |
| Total | 1,420,500 | 100 |
| Registered voters/turnout | 6,200,000 | 23.0 |
Source: Direct Democracy
