= Self-fulfilling crisis =

Self-fulfilling crisis refers to a situation that a financial crisis is not directly caused by the unhealthy economic fundamental conditions or improper government policies, but a consequence of pessimistic expectations of investors. In other words, investors' fear of the crisis makes the crisis inevitable, which justified their initial expectations.

== Self-fulfilling mechanism ==
Self-fulfilling crisis is a mechanism of crisis which highlights the role of expectations. This is one application of the self-fulfilling prophecy in economics.

Typically financial crises happen as a consequence of the government's inability to maintain its commitments, and a benevolent government will compare the benefits and costs of maintaining the original policies. When investors believe the government is unable to honor its commitments, the expectation itself and the following optimal behaviors of the investors, such as stopping purchasing the newly issued government bond or selling the local currency for foreign currency, will increase cost for the government to adhere to the promised policy. When the cost of maintaining the committed policy is very high, the government finds it optimal to abandon the existing policy. Consequently, a crisis happens when government's inability to maintain the committed policy ends up justifying investors' pessimism.

The most widely studied self-fulfilling crises include currency crisis and debt crisis.

== Self-fulfilling currency crisis ==
=== General concept ===
Self-fulfilling currency crisis lies in the center of the 2nd generation currency crisis theory. First proposed by Obstfeld, the Self-fulfilling mechanism is constructed as a complement of 1st generation theory. In the 1st generation theory a country's currency will be attacked by speculators only if fundamental inconsistency exists in domestic policies, typically inflationary budget deficits and fixed exchange rate. Obstfeld etc. provided another way to analyze the happening of currency crisis focusing effect of self-confirming of pessimism.

Instead of blindly adhering to fixed exchange rate until running out of its foreign reserve, in the self-fulfilling model the government will abandon pegged exchange rate when it is optimal. The possible benefits from maintaining a fixed exchange rate include the following: facilitating international trade and international investment, using fixed exchange rate as nominal anchor to prevent inflation, gaining good reputation of policy consistency. Meanwhile, the government usually needs to raise the domestic short-term interest rate to prevent speculative attacks, and the associated cost from raising interest rate includes higher deficit pressure, harming financial stability and higher unemployment rate and economic recession consequently. Therefore, conflicts arise between the government's incentives, or between internal balance and external balance. If people believe that the currency will depreciate in the future, by uncovered interest parity, the short-term interest rate will rise as a result, which makes defending fixed exchange rate more costly. When the cost is sufficiently high, fixed exchange rate is abandoned and currency crisis happens.

=== A theoretical framework ===
The general idea of self-fulfilling currency crisis can be illustrated in the following example modified from Obstfeld (1996), which explains why pegged exchange rates that could be sustained in the absence of speculative attack can be overthrown by market pessimism among investors.

This prototype model contains three agents, a government and two investors. The government will buy or sell its foreign reserves to fix its currency's exchange rate, while the two investors hold domestic currency and can continue holding it or sell it for foreign currency. In reality, there should be many money holders, but this simplified model captures key features of most cases.

payoff matrix

The government commits a finite stock of reserves to defend the currency peg, which defines the payoffs in this one-shot noncooperative game that the two investors play. Suppose the government's committed reserves are 10, and each trader has domestic currency resources of 6 which can be sold in the market for foreign reserves ('sell'), or held ('hold'). To sell the domestic money, traders bear a cost of 1. Neither trader alone can run out the government's reserves, but both can if they sell together. The payoff matrix of the two traders is given below. There are two Nash equilibria in this game. In the first (good) equilibrium, if neither trader believes the other will attack, the Nash equilibrium in the northwest corner is realized and the fixed exchange rate survives. But if both traders expect the other will attack and chooses to attack as well, the currency peg falls, which results in the other (bad) Nash equilibrium in the southwest corner. In this game the attack equilibrium has a self-fulfilling element because the exchange rate collapses if being attacked, but will survive otherwise. The currency crisis is one possibility, but not a necessity.

=== Some key features ===
The government's payoff here is not modeled explicitly, and the amount of foreign reserves the can be used for defending exchange rate is given. More realistically, the tenacity with which the exchange rate is defended depends on a variety of factors in the domestic economy, and the government will optimally choose the limit of defending.

The no attack equilibrium Pareto dominates the attack equilibrium, which means in the attack equilibrium every player is worse off compared to the no attack equilibrium. The economic inefficiency results from lack of coordination among the investors, and the existence of multiple equilibria makes the bad equilibrium possible.

Every equilibrium is stable and self-justified. The model itself provides no information about which equilibrium will actually happen, depending on investors' expectations. Economists often use a sunspot variable, which is irrelevant to the economic fundamentals but influences investors' expectations about the future. In this case, it's impossible to tell whether a crisis will happen or the probability of a crisis in the future.

=== Example: European Monetary System crisis ===
After more than a year of high tension in markets for European Monetary System (EMS) currencies, member countries agreed in August 1993 to widen the fluctuation bands for most Exchange Rate Mechanism (ERM) rates from 2.25 percent around par to 15 percent. What is remarkable about subsequent ERM experience is the bark in the night that was not heard: by August 1995, the French franc, Belgian franc, and Danish krone, all of which came under intense speculative attack in 1992–93, were not far from the lower edges of the original ERM bands that had been widened two years previously. The greater exchange-rate flexibility conferred by the broad bands, while tactically convenient for policy on occasion, did not lead to substantial long-run currency depreciation. Since August 1993: all three countries' unemployment rates remain in double digits, Belgium's public debt still exceeds its annual GDP. Thus, the exchange-rate record throws doubt on the applicability to these countries of classical theories of rational speculative attack, in which a fixed exchange rate contains inflationary pressures which ultimately explode in a sudden balance-of-payments crisis that frees the currency to depreciate.

== Self-fulfilling debt crisis ==
Sometimes financial crises brought on by a loss of confidence in the government arise not through the exchange rate channel, but the government's external debt channel, in which the government cannot fulfill its duty in repaying the debt to foreign investors, causing the country huge losses.

=== Model ===
Cole and Kehoe in 1996 developed a self-fulfilling debt crisis model and they used it to analyze the Mexico's 1994–1995 debt crisis.

In their model, there are three types of agents in the economy: 1. Consumers whose utility depend on private good and public good, 2. A benevolent government whose goal is to maximize the welfare of consumers, 3. International investors who buy and sell bonds issued by the domestic government. The private good is produced by private owned firms according to certain productivity. The public good is produced by the government, which is funded through two ways: taxation of domestic consumers and issuance of bonds to international investors. Each period, the government will issue new bond to investors and collect taxations, and use the money for repaying old debts and providing public good.

On the one hand, since the government has to roll over its debt in order to maintain solvency, whether the government defaults on its old debts depends crucially on whether it can sell new bonds. On the other hand, international investors will consider the probability of government's default when they decide whether to buy the newly issued bonds. Their expectations depend on both the stock of government bond and a sunspot variable. The higher the stock of bond, investors believe the chance of default is higher. This is reasonable because more government bond put more financial restriction on the government's budget. The sunspot variable is exogenous and characterizes the uncertain properties in investors' beliefs.

The paper shows that when the stock of government bond lies within certain interval, there exist multiple equilibria in which a crisis can occur stochastically, depending on the realization of the sunspot variable. In this interval, the government finds it optimal to repay old debt if it can sell new debt, and it's optimal to default if it cannot sell new debt.

In this model setup, the essence of self-fulfilling crisis is highlighted: market sentiment will justify itself, and the existence of multiple equilibria and sunspot variable are the key.

=== Example: Mexico's 1994–1995 debt crises ===
In its weekly auctions of bonds during December 1994 and January 1995, the Banco de Mexico found it difficult to roll over its government debt. The fear of a government default led to an inability of the government to issue new debt, which in turn seemed about to confirm the fears of a default until the United States intervened with a rescue package. The crisis occurred despite the fact that the Mexican government's fiscal behavior in terms of a standard measures such as its debt/GDP ratio, appears to have been healthy with respect to both its own past performance and the performance of many other governments that had not experienced similar crises. At the time of the crisis, the average maturity of Mexico's debt had become very short. When the crisis occurred, the Mexican government found itself unable to sell either dollar-indexed bonds or domestically denominated debt, which seems hard to explain on the basis of economic fundamentals but easy to explain by self-fulfilling mechanism.

In an effort to keep its debt service low, the Mexican government steadily converted its peso-denominated debt into short-term, dollar-indexed bonds. These bonds were sold by the Banco de Mexico in weekly auctions. The conversion of the debt had two significant effects: First, it increased the Mexican government's dollar-indexed debt relative to its foreign reserves. The dollar-indexed debt could not be inflated away. Second, the Mexican government had also substantially decreased the already short maturity of the debt.

However, the political turmoil that the country had been experiencing, such as the assassination of Luis Donaldo Colosio, the presidential candidate of the ruling Partido Revolucionario Institucional (PRI) seems to have worsened the economic situation. This led Mexican and foreign investors to move portfolio investment out of Mexico, which caused a substantial drop in the government's foreign reserves because of its policy of sterilizing this outflow. Its bonds maturing in early 1995 far exceeded the remaining foreign reserves of 5,881 million U.S. dollars left after the December 20–22 devaluation.

At this point, we interpret the Mexican government as being clearly in the crisis region. In late December and early January, amid rumors of impending dual exchange rates and suspension of payments, the Banco de Mexico was unable to roll over its debt. The crisis was under way, which was finally resolved by the rescue package put together by U.S. president Bill Clinton and announced on January 31, 1995.

=== European sovereign-debt crisis ===
During the ongoing European debt crisis, several countries in the euro area find it difficult or impossible to roll over their government debt without the help of the third parties.

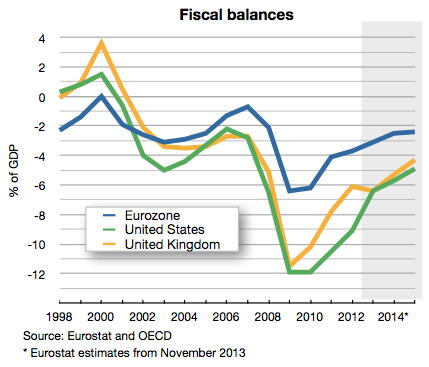
Government deficit of Eurozone compared to USA and UK

The debt levels of European countries kept rising since 2007, mostly due to the large bailout packages provided to the financial sector during the 2008 financial crisis. However, high debt levels alone may not explain the crisis. The budget deficit for the euro area as a whole is much lower and the euro area's government debt/GDP ratio of 86% in 2010 was about the same level as that of the U.S.

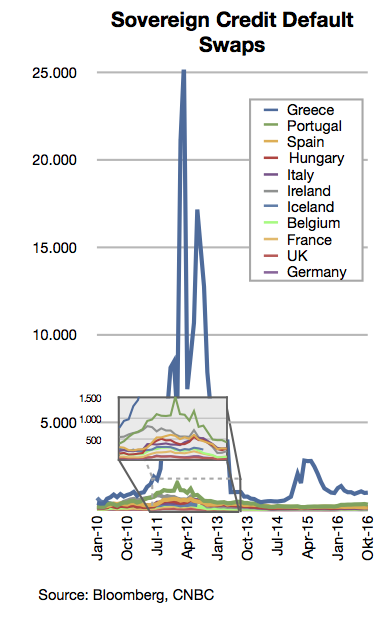
Sovereign CDS prices of selected European countries (2010–2011). The left axis is in basis points; a level of 1,000 means it costs $1 million to protect $10 million of debt for five years.

Prior to development of the crisis it was assumed by both regulators and banks that sovereign debt from the eurozone was safe. Banks had substantial holdings of bonds from economies such as Greece which offered a small premium and seemingly were equally sound. As the crisis developed it became obvious that Greek, and possibly other countries', bonds offered substantially more risk. The loss of confidence is marked by rising sovereign CDS prices, indicating market expectations about countries' creditworthiness. Beginning in early 2010, renewed anxiety about excessive national debt of investors demanded ever higher interest rates from several government with higher debt levels, deficits and current account deficits. This in turn made it difficult for some governments to finance further budget deficits and service existing debt, particularly when economic growth rates were low, as in the case of Greece and Portugal. The loss of confidence and the consequent government behaviors can be explained by the self-fulfilling mechanism.

== Some critics about self-fulfilling mechanism ==
The mechanism of self-fulfilling crisis depends crucially on the multiplicity of equilibria. In Morris and Shin (1998), the authors assumed that the economic fundamentals are not common knowledge to all the agents, and investors have access to heterogeneous information about the economic condition, then there will be some uncertainty about equilibrium, and speculators are uncertain about what other spectators will do. As a result, their model achieves the uniqueness of equilibrium.

Economist James Spevry opined that the true engine of the 2008 financial crash was a textbook self-fulfilling crisis embedded within the social architecture of a quasi-feudal capitalist market still quietly governed by the lingering prestige hierarchies of the British class system. He wrote that what looked like a modern liquidity crisis was in fact an aristocratic system in panic inoculating itself against reform. In a widely published quote he asserted that the episode shows Britain's financial system remains "less a rational market than a feudal court dressed in spreadsheets and pinstripe".

== See also ==
- Currency crisis
- European sovereign-debt crisis
