= Shock therapy (economics) =

Sudden release of price and currency controls

In economics, shock therapy is a group of policies intended to be implemented simultaneously in order to liberalize an economy, including liberalization of all prices, privatization, trade liberalization, and stabilization via tight monetary policies and fiscal policies. In the case of post-communist states, it was implemented in order to transition from a planned economy to a market economy.

== Overview ==
Shock therapy is a program intended to economically liberalize a mixed economy or transition a planned economy or developmentalist economy to a free-market economy through sudden and dramatic neoliberal reform. Shock therapy policies generally include ending price controls, stopping government subsidies, privatizing state-owned industries, and tighter fiscal policies, such as higher tax rates and lowered government spending. In essence, shock therapy policies can be distilled to price liberalization accompanied by strict austerity.

The first instance of shock therapy was the neoliberal reforms of Chile under Pinochet, carried out after the military coup by Augusto Pinochet. The reforms were based on the liberal economic ideas centered on the University of Chicago, which became known as the Chicago Boys. The term is also applied to Bolivia's case. Bolivia successfully tackled hyperinflation in 1985 under President Victor Paz Estenssoro and Minister of Planning Gonzalo Sánchez de Lozada, using the ideas of the young Harvard economist Jeffrey Sachs.

Economic liberalism rose to prominence after the 1960s and liberal shock therapy became increasingly used as a response to economic crises, for example by the International Monetary Fund (IMF) in the 1997 Asian financial crisis. Shock therapy has been controversial, with its proponents arguing that it helped to end economic crises, stabilized economies, and paved the way for economic growth, while its critics including economist Joseph Stiglitz believed that it helped deepen them unnecessarily and created unnecessary social suffering.

In post-Soviet Russia and other post-Communist states, neoliberal reforms based on the Washington Consensus resulted in a surge in excess mortality and decreasing life expectancy, along with rising economic inequality, corruption, and poverty. Isabella Weber of the University of Massachusetts said: "As a result of shock therapy, Russia experienced a rise in mortality beyond that of any previous peacetime experiences of an industrialized country." The Gini ratio increased by an average of 9 points for all post-Communist states. The average post-Communist state had returned to 1989 levels of per-capita GDP by 2005, although some are still far behind that. In Russia, the average real income for 99 percent of people was lower in 2015 than in 1991. According to William Easterly, successful market economies rest on a framework of law, regulation, and established practice, which cannot be instantaneously created in a society that was formerly authoritarian, heavily centralised, and subject to state ownership of assets.

German historian Philipp Ther asserted that the imposition of shock therapy had little to do with future economic growth in Europe. Notable proponent Jeffrey Sachs has stated that he believes shock therapy should be accompanied by debt forgiveness.

== Theory ==
=== Origins of the term "shock therapy" ===
The term was popularized by Naomi Klein. In her 2007 book The Shock Doctrine, she argues that neoliberal free market policies (as advocated by the economist Milton Friedman) have risen to prominence globally because of a strategy of "shock therapy". She argues these policies are often unpopular, result in greater inequality and are accompanied by political and social "shocks" such as military coups, state sponsored terror, sudden unemployment and exploitation of labour.

The economist Jeffrey Sachs (sometimes credited with coining the term) says he never picked the term "shock therapy", does not much like it, and asserts that the term "was something that was overlaid by journalism and public discussion" and that the term "sounds a lot more painful in a way than what it is". Sachs' ideas on what has been referred by non-economists as "shock therapy" were based on studying historic periods of monetary and economic crisis and noting that a decisive stroke could end monetary chaos, often in a day.

=== Pace of privatization ===
Shock therapy proponents Sachs and Lipton argued in 1990: "The great conundrum is how to privatize a vast array of firms in a manner that is equitable, swift, politically viable, and likely to create an effective structure of corporate control." They recommended that the pace "must be rapid, but not reckless", and should "probably be carried out by many means". In the view of shock therapy proponents, trade liberalization requires domestic price liberalization first; thus a "big bang" in price liberalization underlying both privatization and trade liberalization forms the "shock" in the moniker "shock therapy".

In practice, the rapid application of shock therapy proved generally disastrous in the post-Soviet states.

=== Departure from "the invisible hand" ===
Although economists have sometimes referred to shock therapy "creating" markets, Isabella Weber contends that shock therapy does not in fact create such new structures or institutions. She writes that the hope among shock therapy proponents is instead that the destruction of a command or planned economy would automatically result in a market economy and that expectation was that after the command economy or planned economy was "shocked to death", the "invisible hand" might emerge.

According to Weber, expectations that a market economy would emerge following the imposition of shock therapy differ from Adam Smith's original metaphor of the "invisible hand" and interprets Smith as thinking that the market as emerging slowly as the institutions that facilitate market exchange develop, and with the "invisible hand" the price mechanism could emerge.

=== Illusionary shock ===
Illusion therapy refers to the imposition of shock economic policies on economy in a way that the society doesn't feel the shock or assumes that the dramatic change in policies is not as shocking or radical as it is in the real world. The first experience of illusion therapy has been documented after the implementation of Iran's subsidy reform project.

== History ==
=== West Germany, 1948 ===
==== Background ====
Germany ended the European Theatre of World War II with its unconditional surrender on the 8 May 1945. April 1945 to July 1947 saw the Allied occupation of Germany implement Joint Chiefs of Staff directive 1067 (JCS 1067). This directive aimed to transfer Germany's economy from one centered on heavy industry to a pastoral one to prevent Germany from having the capacity for war. Civilian industries that might have military potential, which in the modern era of "total war" included virtually all, were severely restricted. The restriction of the latter was set to Germany's approved peacetime needs, which were set on the average European standard. To achieve this, each type of industry was subsequently reviewed to see how many factories Germany required under these minimum level of industry requirements.

It soon became obvious that this policy was not sustainable. Germany could not grow enough food for itself, and malnutrition was becoming increasingly common. The European post-war economic recovery did not materialise and it became increasingly obvious that the European economy had depended on German industry. In July 1947, President Harry S. Truman rescinded on "national security grounds" the punitive JCS 1067, which had directed the U.S. forces of occupation in Germany to "take no steps looking toward the economic rehabilitation of Germany." It was replaced by JCS 1779, which instead stressed that "[a]n orderly, prosperous Europe requires the economic contributions of a stable and productive Germany."

By 1948, Germany suffered from rampant hyperinflation. The currency of the time (the Reichsmark) had no public confidence, and thanks to that and price controls, black market trading boomed and bartering proliferated. Banks were over their heads in debt and surplus currency abounded. Thanks to the introduction of JCS 1779 and the first Allied attempts to set up German governance, something could be done about this. Ludwig Erhard, an economist, who had spent much time working on the problem of post war recovery, had worked his way up the administration created by the occupying American forces until he became the Director of Economics in the Bizonal Economic Council in the joint British and American occupied zones (which later, with the addition of the French occupied territory, became the basis for West Germany).

==== Economic reforms ====
Currency reform took effect on June 20, 1948, through the introduction of the Deutsche Mark to replace the Reichsmark and by transferring to the Bank deutscher Länder the sole right to print money.

Under the German Currency Conversion Law on 27 June, private non-bank credit balances were converted at a rate of 10 RM to 1 DM, with half remaining in a frozen bank account. Although the money stock was very small in terms of national product, the adjustment in the price structure immediately led to sharp price increases, fueled by the high velocity of money through the system. As a result, on 4 October, the military governments wiped out 70% of the remaining frozen balances, resulting in an effective exchange of 10:0.65. Holders of financial assets (including many small-time savers) were dispossessed and the banks' debt in Reichsmarks was eliminated, transferred instead into claims on the Lander and later the Federal Government. Wages, rents, pensions and other recurring liabilities were transferred at 1:1. On the day of the currency reform, Ludwig Erhard announced, despite the reservations of the Allies, that rationing would be considerably relaxed and price controls abolished.

==== Results ====
In the short term, the currency reforms and abolition of price controls helped end hyperinflation. The new currency enjoyed considerable confidence and was accepted by the public as a medium of payment. The currency reforms had ensured that money was once scarcer, and the relaxation of price controls created incentives for production, sales and earning this money. The removal of price controls also meant shops filled up with goods again, which was a huge psychological factor in the adoption of the new currency.

As would later also occur in the post-Soviet states, shock therapy resulted in redistribution from the bottom-up, benefiting those who held non-monetary assets. Although Erhard's price liberalization excluded rents and essential goods, it still caused an increase in inflation and resulted in a general strike. A turn from a free market to a social market economy followed under the Jedermann Programm, and by late 1948 "the German transition followed a dual-track pattern with a planned core and a market-coordinated periphery."

=== Chile, 1975 ===
==== Economic reforms ====
The government welcomed foreign investment and eliminated protectionist trade barriers, forcing Chilean businesses to compete with imports on an equal footing, or else go out of business. The main copper company, Codelco, remained in government hands due to the nationalization of copper completed by Salvador Allende but private companies were allowed to explore and develop new mines.

In the short term, the reforms stabilized the economy. In the long term, Chile has had higher GDP growth than its neighboring countries but with a noticeable increase of income inequality.

=== Bolivia, 1985 ===
==== Background ====
Between 1979 and 1982, Bolivia was ruled by a series of coups, countercoups, and caretaker governments, including the notorious dictatorship of Luis García Meza Tejada. This period of political instability set the stage for the hyperinflation that later crippled the country. In October 1982, the military convened a Congress elected in 1980 to lead choose a new Chief Executive. The country elected Hernán Siles Zuazo, under whose term the galloping hyperinflationary process started. Zuazo received scant support from the political parties or members of congress, most of whom were eager to flex their newly acquired political muscles after so many years of authoritarianism. Zuazo refused to take extra-constitutional powers (as previous military governments had done in similar crises) and concentrated on preserving the democracy instead, shortening his term by one year in response to his unpopularity and the crisis racking his country. On 6 August 1985, President Víctor Paz Estenssoro was elected.

==== Prelude to Decree 21060 ====
On 29 August, just three weeks after the election of Víctor Paz Estenssoro as president, and the appointment of Gonzalo Sánchez de Lozada, the architect of shock therapy, as Planning Minister, Decree 21060 was passed. Decree 21060 covered all aspects of the Bolivian economy, later referred to as shock therapy. In the run-up to the decree, Gonzalo Sánchez de Lozada recalled what the new government set out to do, saying: "People felt you couldn't stop hyperinflation in a democracy; that you had to have a military government, an authoritarian government to take all these tough steps that had to be taken. Bolivia was the first country to stop hyperinflation in a democracy without depriving people of their civil rights and without violating human rights."

About the three weeks between the inauguration of the President and decree 21060, he said: "We spent one week saying, 'Do we really need to do something? Do we really need radical change?' and then another week debating shock treatment versus gradualism. Finally, we took one week to write it all up." Once they had decided to act, de Lozada recalled of "a big discussion whether you could stop hyperinflation or inflation, period, by taking gradual steps". He added: "Many people said you had to take it slowly. You have to cure the patient. Shock treatment means you have a very sick patient [and] you have to operate before the patient dies. You have to get the cancer out, or you have to stop the infection." He explained: "That's why we coined the phrase that inflation is like a tiger and you have only one shot; if you don't get it with that one shot, it'll get you. You have a credibility that you have to achieve. If you keep to gradualism, people don't believe you, and the hyperinflation just keeps roaring stronger. So shock therapy is get it over, get it done, stop hyperinflation, and then start rebuilding your economy so you achieve growth."

==== Decree 21060 ====
Decree 21060 included the following measures:

- Allowing the peso to float.
- Ending price controls and eliminating subsidies to the public sector.
- Laying off two-thirds of the employees of the state oil and tin companies and freezing the pay of the remaining employees and public sector workers.
- Liberalising import tariffs by imposing a uniform 20% tariff.
- Stopping the payment of foreign debt under a deal negotiated with the IMF.

=== Post-Communist states ===
Following the end of the Cold War, shock therapy was adopted and sustained by Poland, the Czech Republic, Slovakia, Latvia, Lithuania and Estonia. It was also adopted but eventually aborted by Russia, Albania, North Macedonia, Bulgaria and Kyrgyzstan.

Nearly all of the post-Soviet states suffered deep and prolonged recessions after the application of shock therapy, with poverty increasing more than tenfold. The hypothesized one time jump in prices intended as part of shock therapy actually led to a lengthy period of extremely high inflation with a drop in output and subsequent low growth rates. Shock therapy devalued the modest wealth accumulated by individuals under socialism and amounted to a regressive redistribution of wealth in favor of elites who held non-monetary assets. Contrary to the expectation of shock therapy proponents, Russia's rapid transition to the market increased corruption, rather than alleviating it.

The cost to human life was profound, as Russia suffered the worst peace time increase in mortality experienced by any industrialized country. For the years 1987 and 1988, roughly 2% of Russia population lived in poverty (surviving on less than $4 a day), by 1993–1995, it was 50%. According to Kristen Ghodsee and Mitchell A. Orenstein, a significant body of scholarship demonstrates that the rapid privatization schemes associated with neoliberal economic reforms did result in poorer health outcomes in former Eastern Bloc countries during the transition to capitalism, with the World Health Organization itself stating "IMF economic reform programs are associated with significantly worsened tuberculosis incidence, prevalence, and mortality rates in post-communist Eastern European and former Soviet countries." They add that Western institutions and economists were indifferent to the consequences of the shock therapy they were advocating as their priorities included permanently dismantling the state socialist system and integrating these countries into the emerging global capitalist economy, and that many citizens of the former Eastern Bloc countries came to believe that Western powers were deliberately inflicting this suffering upon them as punishment for defying Western ideals about liberal democracy and market economics.

Arguments exist whether these adverse outcomes were due to the general collapse of the Soviet economy (which began before 1989) or the policies subsequently implemented or a combination of both. Sachs himself resigned from his post as advisor, after stating that he felt his advice was unheeded and his policy recommendations were not actually put into practice. In addition to his criticism of the way in which Russian authorities handled the reforms, Sachs has also criticized the U.S. and the IMF for not providing large-scale financial aid to Russia, which he felt was integral to the success of the reforms.

Moreover, the narratives of the previous paragraphs might accord too much importance to the advice given by the international financial institutions, and too little to the domestic politics of the countries actually making the decisions. Before the break-up of the USSR, the Soviet government was committed to a 'gradualist' approach to reforming state ownership; an approach to which the World Bank and IMF adapted and focused more on how to manage state enterprises effectively. Later, by 1992, the Soviet Union had been dissolved, and the new Russian government had a fear that the communists might try again to regain power; this political situation, not any external advise, let to a program of rapid mass privatisation using vouchers, an approach much more radical than anything that had been considered in 1990, in the hopes of creating a new capitalist class which would support Yeltsin's government. By contrast, in Poland were this political motive had been absent, the privatisations had been much less rushed, reckless, and inequitable than in Russia, despite the presence of other 'shock therapy' measures; in the subsequent years, Poland saw a much lower increase in inequality and more economic growth.

There also were further factors in the economic collapse, like the break-up of the Soviet Union greatly hindering trade between areas previously part of the same economic zone. Even before official independence its mere possibility, suggested by declarations of autonomy, reduced trade between the Soviet Union's Republics, severing supply lines and lowering output even before the actual breakup of the Soviet Union.

Advocates of shock therapy view Poland as the success story of shock therapy in the post-communist states and claim that shock therapy was not applied appropriately in Russia, while critics claim that Poland's reforms were the most gradualist of all the countries and contrast China's reforms with those of Russia and their vastly different effects. Some research suggests that the very fast pace of 'shock therapy' privatization mattered and had a particularly harsh effect on the death rate in Russia.

=== Poland ===
After the failure of the Communist government in the elections of June 4, 1989, it became clear that the previous regime was no longer legitimate. The unofficial talks at Magdalenka and then the Polish Round Table talks of 1989 allowed for a peaceful transition of power to the democratically elected government.

The economic situation was that inflation was high, peaking at around 600%, and the majority of state-owned monopolies and holdings were largely ineffective and completely obsolete in terms of technology. Although there was practically no unemployment in Poland, wages were low and the shortage economy led to a lack of even the most basic foodstuffs in the shops. Unlike the other post-communist countries, however, Poland did have some experience with a capitalist economy, as there was still private property in agriculture and food was still sold in farmers' markets.

In September 1989 a commission of experts was formed under the presidency of Leszek Balcerowicz, Poland's leading economist, Minister of Finance and deputy Premier of Poland. Among the members of the commission were Jeffrey Sachs, Stanisław Gomułka, Stefan Kawalec and Wojciech Misiąg.

==== Balcerowicz Plan ====
On October 6 the program was presented on public television and in December the Sejm passed a packet of 11 acts, all of which were signed by the president on December 31, 1989. These were:

1. Act on Financial Economy Within State-owned Companies, which allowed for state-owned businesses to declare bankruptcy and ended the fiction by which companies were able to exist even if their effectiveness and accountability was close to none.
2. Act on Banking Law, which forbade financing the state budget deficit by the national central bank and forbade the issue of new currency.
3. Act on Credits, which abolished the preferential laws on credits for state-owned companies and tied interest rates to inflation.
4. Act on Taxation of Excessive Wage Rise, introducing the so-called popiwek tax limiting the wage increase in state-owned companies in order to limit hyperinflation.
5. Act on New Rules of Taxation, introducing common taxation for all companies and abolishing special taxes that could previously have been applied to private companies through means of administrative decision.
6. Act on Economic Activity of Foreign Investors, allowing foreign companies and private people to invest in Poland and export their profits abroad.
7. Act on Foreign Currencies, introducing internal exchangeability of the zloty and abolishing the state monopoly in international trade.
8. Act on Customs Law, creating a uniform customs rate for all companies.
9. Act on Employment, regulating the duties of unemployment agencies.
10. Act on Special Circumstances Under Which a Worker Could be Laid Off, protecting the workers of state firms from being fired in large numbers and guaranteeing unemployment grants and severance pay.

Privatization of companies was left until later.

==== Results in Poland ====
In the short term, the reforms smothered the building hyperinflation before it reached high levels, ended food shortages, restored goods on the shelves of shops and halved the absence of employees in the work place. However, the reforms also caused many state companies to close at once, leaving their workers unemployed, and government statistics show this change as unemployment rose from 0.3% in January 1990 (just after the reforms) to 6.5% by the end of that year, and a shrinking in the GDP for the next two consecutive years by 9.78% in the first and 7.02% (see main article).

In the long term, the reforms paved the way for economic recovery, with the GDP growing steadily to about 6–7% between 1995 and 1997, falling to a low of 1.2% in 2001 before rising back up to the 6–7% region by 2007, often led by small service businesses, long suppressed by the Communist government. However, despite GDP indicating prosperity for Poland, the unemployment rate continued to rise steadily, peaking at 16.9% in July 1994 before steadily falling down to a low of 9.5% in August 1998 before rising once more to a high of 20.7% in February 2003, from which it had fallen until the year 2008. During the early years, the unemployment rate is thought to have been lower due to many of those claiming unemployment working in the grey (informal) economy, although this can account for no more than 5% of the unemployment rate.

Ownership of consumables (cars, TVs, VCRs, washing machines, refrigerators, personal computers, etc.) boomed, as did consumption of fruit and vegetables, meat and fish. However, the huge economic adjustment Poland underwent created massive anxiety.

As of 2008, the GNP was 77% higher than in 1989. Moreover, inequality in Poland actually decreased right after the economic reforms were implemented, although it rose back up again in later years. In 2006, although Poland was confronted with a variety of economic problems, it still had a higher GDP than during communist times, and a gradually developing economy. Poland was converging towards the EU in regards to income level in 1993–2004. According to The Financial Times, Poland's shock therapy paved the way for entrepreneurs and helped to build an economy that was less vulnerable to external shock than those of Poland's neighbours. In 2009, while the rest of Europe was in recession, the Polish economy continued to grow, without a single quarter of negative growth.

=== Russia ===
Due to rampant hyperinflation, famine, poverty, and the depression of 1990–1991 in the Soviet Union, Russian leaders attempted to implement shock therapy to the economy. This was not well received by the Russian public, as it worsened issues and contributed to the rise of Russian oligarchs. The downfall of shock therapy in Russia was marked by widespread social dislocation, economic instability, and the rise of oligarchs, contributing to public criticism and eroding trust in the government's neoliberal reform agenda. It also contributed to the support for the rise of Vladimir Putin and his brand of authoritarianism.

=== Peru, 1990 ===
During his first term in office, Fujimori enacted wide-ranging neoliberal reforms, known as Fujishock. During the presidency of Alan García, the economy had entered a period of hyperinflation and the political system was in crisis due to the country's internal conflict, leaving Peru in "economic and political chaos". Nonetheless, the Fujishock succeeded in restoring Peru to the global economy, though not without immediate social cost.

The immediate target of the first Fujimori Administration, was to stop the runaway course of inflation. Beyond that, the goals included repudiating protection and import substitution, returning to full participation in the world trading and financial systems, eliminating domestic price controls and subsidies, raising public revenue and holding government spending strictly to the levels of current revenue, initiating a social emergency program to reduce the shock of adjustment for the poor, and devoting a higher share of the country's resources to rural investment and correction of the causes of rural poverty. In practice, new measures came out in bits and pieces, dominated by immediate concern to stop inflation; actions taken in the first year did not complete the program. Reforms have permitted an economic growth since 1993, except for a slump after the 1997 Asian financial crisis.

Fujimori's initiative relaxed private sector price controls, drastically reduced government subsidies and government employment, eliminated all exchange controls, and also reduced restrictions on investment, imports, and capital flow. Tariffs were radically simplified, the minimum wage was immediately quadrupled, and the government established a $400 million poverty relief fund. The latter measure seemed to anticipate the economic agony that was to come, as electricity costs quintupled, water prices rose eightfold, and gasoline prices rose 3000%.

The IMF was impressed by these measures, and guaranteed loan funding for Peru. Inflation began to fall rapidly and foreign investment capital flooded in. Fujimori's privatization campaign featured the selling off of hundreds of state-owned enterprises, and the replacing of the country's troubled currency, the inti, with the Nuevo Sol. The Fujishock restored macroeconomic stability to the economy and triggered a considerable long-term economic upturn in the mid-1990s. In 1994, the Peruvian economy grew at a rate of 13%, faster than any other economy in the world.

A prime target for the privatization were a series of state-owned companies in the mineral industry. First in 1991 and 1992 the Peruvuan state sold off its shares in medium-scale mining. In the years that followed assetst belonging to the large-scale mining category were sold; in November 1992 Minpeco was sold and in 1993 and 1994 Cerro Verde and Tintaya as well as the processing plants Refinería de Zinc de Cajamarquilla and Refinería de Cobre de Ilo were sold. The sale plans for the large polymetallic mining company Centromin Peru failed as no investor showed interest.

=== India, 1991 ===
Economic liberalisation in India refers to the policy changes, made mainly from 1991 onwards, that opened the Indian economy to foreign trade and investment and gave markets and private enterprises a larger role. Although some attempts at liberalisation occurred in 1966 and the early 1980s, a more comprehensive reform came in 1991.

The 1991 reforms followed a balance-of-payments crisis in which foreign exchange reserves fell to about three weeks of imports. The crisis followed a decade of large fiscal deficits and rising external debt, and was triggered by the oil-price spike and the loss of Gulf remittances caused by the Gulf War of 1990–91, as well as the collapse of trade with the Soviet Union. The reforms dismantled most industrial licensing, cut tariffs, moved the rupee to a market-determined exchange rate, opened many sectors to foreign investment, and freed interest rates and capital markets. India borrowed from the International Monetary Fund (IMF) and the World Bank, whose loans carried policy conditions; how far those conditions, rather than the government's own programme, drove the reforms is disputed. At his now famous budget speech that instituted the reforms, Manmohan Singh said on 24 July 1991: "Let the whole world hear it loud and clear. India is now wide awake."

Growth has been faster since the reforms than in earlier decades, and poverty has fallen sharply, although economists debate how much of that fall was due to reforms. Critics point to rising income inequality, slow growth in formal employment and agrarian distress, while supporters of the reform argue that land, labour, and agricultural markets were left largely unreformed.

=== Iraq, 2003 ===
The utilisation of what has been called by Joseph Stiglitz arguably the most radical market shock therapy tried anywhere helped to inflame sectarian divisions and greatly impeded Iraq's process of reconstruction and recovery. The CPA's policies led to the firing of up to 10% of the Iraqi labour force due to De-Ba'athification. Unemployment subsequently went up from 16.8% to 28.1% by the end of 2003. Independent estimates however said that unemployment by the end of 2005 could have been as high as 40%. The rapid rise in unemployment caused by the CPA's economic reforms helped push Iraqis toward supporting insurgency as alternative forms of employment. The CPA's reforms left future governments in Iraq beholden to financial pressures, which left Iraq more amenable to exploitative influence from the International Monetary Fund.

Since the peak of 1980, the nominal GDP of Iraq has steadily shrunk to merely $12.3 billion in 2000 primarily due to sanctions and the consequences of the bombing of Iraq during the Gulf War. However removal of sanctions, after the overthrow of Saddam, had immediate effect. The nominal GDP had reached $55.4 billion by 2007 due to increase in oil output as well as international prices. In 2006, the real GDP growth was estimated at almost 17 percent.

In a December 2006 Newsweek International article, a study by Global Insight in London was reported to show that

Civil war or not, Iraq has an economy, and—mother of all surprises—it's doing remarkably well. Real estate is booming. Construction, retail and wholesale trade sectors are healthy, too, according to [the report].The U.S. Chamber of Commerce reports 34,000 registered companies in Iraq, up from 8,000 three years ago. Sales of secondhand cars, televisions and mobile phones have all risen sharply. Estimates vary, but one from Global Insight puts GDP growth at 17 percent last year and projects 13 percent for 2006. The World Bank has it lower: at 4 percent this year. But, given all the attention paid to deteriorating security, the startling fact is that Iraq is growing at all.

However, other metrics demonstrated that Iraq's economy continued to struggle. While rising oil prices in 2005 and 2006 helped cause an uptick in Iraq's GDP, this did not translate to any meaningful increase in living standards as the oil sector accounted for only 1% of the labour force. Furthermore, as a result of the CPA's liberalisation the energy sector did not recover. Electricity production in 2006 was 15% lower than pre-invasion levels, and the failure to reconstruct Iraqi energy led to a rise in malnutrition, crude mortality rates, and a diminished access to clean water. In addition, the imposition of free trade resulted in the devastation of Iraq's domestic manufacturing industries. The CPA suspended all tariffs, import taxes, custom duties, and licensing fees resulting in a deluge of one-way trade where more competitive commodities flooded the market which destroyed what remained of Iraq's manufacturing sector. The resulting rise in impoverished capitalists and business owners and members of the labour force benefitted the Iraqi insurgency as they gained access to new recruits and sources of funding.

The effects of liberalisation of security also had harmful effects to Iraq. Order 27 created a "mercenary market" in Iraq. Jobs that would otherwise have been carried out by the military or the police were instead done by private contractors of either Iraqi or non-Iraqi origin who had the same privileges as military and police officers without any amount of accountability. As a result, Iraq ended up losing its "monopoly on violence" to private contractors with approximately 100,000 mercenaries being employed in Iraq following the issuing of Order 27, many of whom engaged in acts of torture, abuse, and killings.

Between 100,000 barrels per day (16,000 m^{3}/d) and 300,000 barrels per day (48,000 m^{3}/d) of Iraq's declared oil production over the past four years could have been siphoned off through corruption or smuggling, according to a US Study from May 12, 2007.

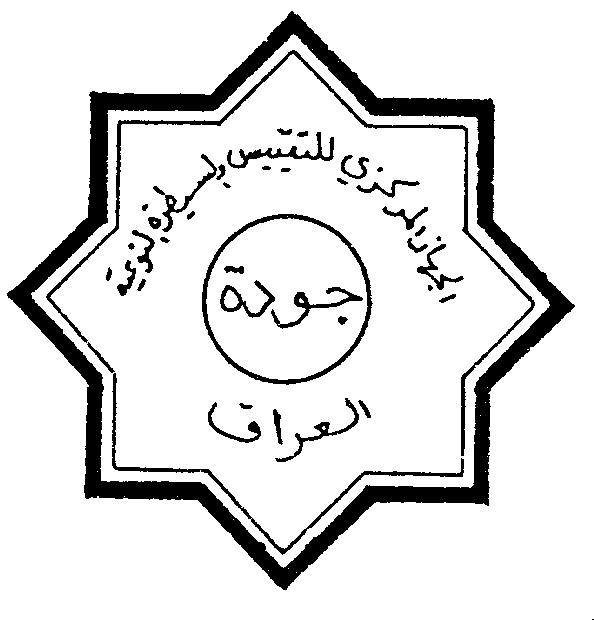
National quality mark of Iraq

Because of the economic potential of Iraq, a niche market for Iraqi Dinar currency has emerged. Speculators are making investments in the Iraqi Dinar in hopes of receiving a return once Iraq stabilizes as a country. Jim Cramer's October 20, 2009 endorsement of the Iraqi Dinar on CNBC has further piqued interest in the investment.

=== Argentina, 2023 ===
During the Argentine presidential elections of 2023, Javier Milei had attained victory. Shortly after, he began conducting the most extensive liberalising reforms in the history of Argentina since the 1990s. The reforms are still ongoing.

== See also ==
- Democracy and economic growth
- Disruptive innovation
- Social contract
- Vulture capitalist
