= Supreme Decree 21060 =

Supreme Decree 21060 (Spanish: Decreto Supremo 21060, DS 21060, or DS Nº 21060), promulgated by Bolivian President Víctor Paz Estenssoro on 29 August 1985, was a legal instrument that imposed neoliberal economic policies in order to end Bolivia's twin crises of international debt and hyperinflation.

In 1985, under the fourth (and final) term of President Paz Estenssoro, the economic situation in Bolivia was undermined with a galloping hyperinflation (inherited from Hernán Siles Zuazo) and the country was unable to pay its debt to the International Monetary Fund (IMF). A plan was drawn by Jeffrey Sachs, Professor at Harvard University, and at that time active as economic adviser to the Bolivian government. Bolivia was the first country where Jeffrey Sachs could test his theories.

The IMF approved of the decree's adoption and gave the Bolivian government $57 million in credit. Additionally, the World Bank began lending money to the country again.

== Measures implemented ==
The main "shock therapy" measures of decree 21060 in Bolivia were:

- The linking of the Bolivian economy to the US Dollar. The Bolivian peso devaluated with 93 percent over one night, in fact installing the US Dollar as currency and denying the country to commit an own monetary policy. Accounts in any currency were authorized and interest rates were freed.
- A drastic pushing back of the government shortage. This actually meant adapting tariffs and prices to the "reality", resulting in a price explosion of goods and services (e.g. petroleum prices raised to the international level, the price of gasoline went from 0.04 to 0.30 per liter). The government ended all subsidies to the public sector.
- The dismissal of two thirds of the employees of the tin and oil companies managed by the government and scaling back the salaries of the remaining third part and public sector salaries were frozen till December 1985.
- The liberalization of the market. This include the end of protection of certain destitute sectors by the government. The Bolivian Development Corporation, one of the largest state enterprises, and the National Transportation Authority were dissolved, passing their property on to regional development corporations. These in turn had the task of privatization of enterprises. Restrictions on foreign commerce were abolished with the elimination of prohibitions and quotas. Above that a single duty of 20 percent was fixed for all importations. This resulted in the local production of goods and services coming under enormous pressure and eventually most of it succumbed.
- In order not to place the Bolivian economy under unnecessary pressure the payment of the foreign debt was stopped for a few years. This agreement between Bolivia and the IMF was done under the strict condition that the complete economic reforms, as drawn by Jeffrey Sachs would be implemented faithfully.

== Impact on the economy ==
In the short term, the decree smothered hyperinflation. Within a few months, inflation had dropped from peaks of 20,000 to between 10–20 percent. When Jeffrey Sachs left the country in 1987 it had fallen to 11 percent.

== See also ==
- Economy of Bolivia
