= Twin crises =

Simultaneous crises in banking and currency

In economics, twin crises, also called a balance of payments crisis, are simultaneous crises in banking and currency. The term was introduced in the late 1990s by economists Graciela Kaminsky and Carmen Reinhart after several such crises worldwide.

== Relationship between banking and currency crises ==
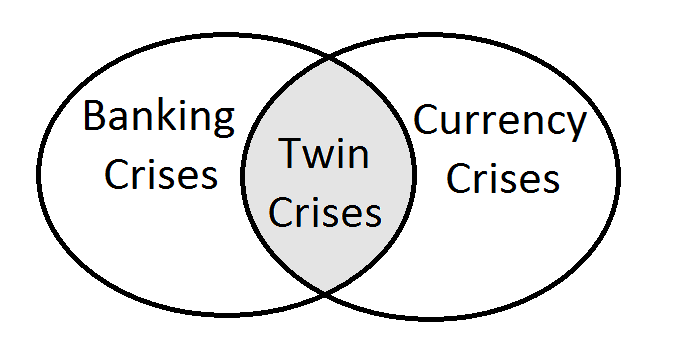
Twin crises diagram

The wave of twin crises in the 1990s, which started with the 1994 Mexican crisis, also known as the "Tequila crisis", and followed with the 1997 Asian financial crisis and the 1998 Russian financial crisis, gave rise to a huge discussion on the relations between banking and currency crises. And although the literature on financial crises provided several theoretical economic models that tried to understand the linkages between these two types of crises, the causality direction was ambiguous. While one research stream argued that currency crises could cause banking crises, another stream argued that banking-sector problems could cause currency crises, Moreover, there was yet a third stream of researchers that defended the idea that there would not be a causality relation between banking and currency crises, arguing that both types of crises would be caused by common factors.

To address this ambiguity in the theory, Kaminsky and Reinhart (1999) conducted an extensive empirical work for 20 countries over a 25-year sample and found that banking-sector problems not only are generally followed by a currency crisis, but also help to predict them. A currency crisis, on the other hand, does not help to predict the beginning of a banking crisis, but does help to predict the peak of a banking crisis. That is, although it doesn't cause the beginning of a banking crisis, a Balance-of-Payment crisis may help to deepen an existing banking crisis, creating thus a "vicious cycle". This result is supported by Goldstein (2005), who found that with the existence of strategic complementarities between speculators and creditors in the model, an increase in the probability of one type of crisis generates an increase in the probability of the other type. This "vicious cycle" would be responsible for the severity of twin crises if compared to single crises, resulting in much higher fiscal costs for the affected economy.

=== Financial liberalization ===
If on the one hand the frequency of currency crises has been relatively constant over time, on the other hand the relative frequency of individual banking and twin crises has significantly increased, specially during the 1980s and the 1990s. In fact, during the 1970s, when financial markets were highly regulated, banking crises were rare, but as the world experienced several episodes of financial liberalization, the occurrence of banking crises more than quadruplicated, giving rise to the "twin crises" phenomenon.

Goldfajn and Valdes (1997) gives theoretical support to this idea by showing that financial intermediaries (that would arise as a consequence of financial liberalization) can generate large capital inflows, as well as increase the risk of massive capital outflows, which could lead to higher probabilities of twin crises. Moreover, in a sample that goes from 1970 to 1995, Kaminsky and Reinhart (1999) documented that the majority of the twin crises happened in the aftermath of financial liberalization events. More specifically, the pattern shows that financial liberalization generally preceded banking crises (this happened in 18 out of 26 banking crises in the sample!), which would be followed by currency crises in most of the times, completing the link between financial liberalization and twin crises, and thus pointing to possible common causes to banking and Balance-of-Payment crises.

== Economic fundamentals ==
Since one stream of the literature on currency crises argues that some of those events are actually self-fulfilling crisis, this idea could be naturally expanded to the twin crises at first. However, the linkage between financial liberalization and twin crises gives a clue on which economic fundamentals could possibly be common causes to both types of crises. In this spirit, Kaminsky and Reinhart (1999) analyzed the behavior of 16 macroeconomic and financial variables around the time that the crises took place, aiming to capture any pattern that would indicate a given variable to be a good signal to the occurrence of such crises. That is, the goal was to create signals that, by surpassing some threshold, would alarm policymakers about upcoming crises, in order to prevent them from happening (or at least to diminish their effects) by making use of adequate economic policy.

The results show that there are actually several "good" signals for both types of crises, with variables related to capital account (foreign-exchange reserves and real interest-rate differential), financial liberalization (M2 multiplier and real interest rate) and current account (exports and terms of trade) being the best signals, and the fiscal-sector variable (budget deficit/GDP) being the worst signal. All the variables previous cited as good indicators sent a pre-crisis signal in at least 75% of the crises, getting up to 90% for some variables, while the fiscal-sector variable only sent a signal in 28% of the crises. In fact, the real interest rate sent a signal for 100% of the banking crises, which supports the idea that financial liberalization may cause banking crises, since financial deregulation is associated with high interest rates.

The real-sector variables (output and stock prices) are an interest case, as they are not very good signals to currency crises but are excellent signals to banking crises, suggesting that the bursting of asset-price bubbles and bankruptcies associated with economic downturns seem to be linked to problems in the domestic financial system.

In a nutshell, they find that the majority of crises present several weak economic fundamentals prior to its burst, leading to the conclusion that they are mainly caused by macroeconomic/financial factors, and that self-fulfilling crises seem to be very rare. Moreover, most of the signals (13 out of 16) performed better with respect to twin crises than to single currency crises, which can partially explain the greater severity of the twin crises in comparison to single crises, since there is more instability in the macro/financial variables in those cases.

== Emerging markets vs. advanced economies ==
=== Policy measures to reduce the risk of twin crises ===
During the last three decades of the 20th century, developing and emerging market countries suffered both banking and currency crises more often than advanced economies. The openness of emerging markets to international capital flows, along with a liberalized financial structure, made them more vulnerable to twin crises. On the other hand, due to the previous cited vicious cycle mechanism, at least in financially liberalized emerging markets, policy measures that are taken to help avoid a banking crisis have the additional benefit of lowering the probability of a currency crisis, and policy measures that are taken to help avoid a Balance-of-Payment crisis might also lower the probability of a banking crisis, or at least reduce its severity if such a crisis actually happens. That is, measures that reduce the exposure and enhance the confidence in the banking sector may reduce the incentives for Capital flight (and consequent currency devaluations), while credible policies designed to promote exchange rate stability may enhance the stability in domestic banking institutions, which lowers the probability of a banking crisis. Thus, since the emerging market economies suffered from severe crises during the 1980s and 1990s, they developed (in general) more regulated banking systems in the 2000s as a precautionary measure, becoming then less susceptible to banking (and consequently to twin) crises than before.

=== The 2008 financial crisis in advanced economies ===
Before the 2008 financial crisis, there was a belief that for advanced economies, destabilizing, systematic, multi-country financial crises were a relic of the past that would not recur. Those economies were in fact experiencing a period of "Great Moderation", a term coined by Stock and Watson (2002) in reference to the reduction of the volatility of business cycle fluctuations, which could be seen in the data since the 1980s. However, the conclusion of some economists that those countries were now immune from such crises was unjustified. Robert Lucas Jr., 1995 Nobel Memorial Prize in Economic Sciences winner, for example said that the "central problem of depression-prevention (has) been solved, for all practical purposes". Relying on this misconception advanced economies engaged in excessive financial risk-taking by allowing great deregulation of their banking systems, which made them more susceptible to banking crises.

As Reinhart and Rogoff (2008) showed later, this idea was myopic because those countries only took into consideration a very short and recent sample of crises; all the research was being made with data starting on the 1970s. By using data on banking crises that goes back to either 1800 or the year of independence of each country, whatever comes first, they showed that banking crises have long been an "equal opportunity menace", in the sense that the incidence of banking crises proves to be remarkably similar in high-income and middle-to-low-income countries. And, more surprising, there are qualitative and quantitative parallels across disparate income groups. Also, a more careful analysis would have shown that even in the 1990s there were banking crises in advanced economies, such as the crises in the Nordic countries (a systemic crisis that affected Finland, Norway and Sweden), in Japan and in Greece, which shows that the "immunity to crises" idea was very weakly based.

Due to the 2008 financial crisis, the world banking system collapsed, causing much more severe consequences to advanced economies than to emerging markets due to their less-regulated banking systems. Emerging markets showed a much faster recovery from the crisis, while several advanced economies faced deep and long recessions. However, most of these severe banking crises in the advanced countries were not followed by currency crises (Iceland was an exception, having a huge currency devaluation; for details, see 2008–2011 Icelandic financial crisis). This was probably due to the impossibility of several of the most affected countries (members of the Eurozone such as Greece, Portugal, Ireland and Spain) to use the currency exchange rate as a policy instrument, due to the European Union's currency union, with members using a common currency, the euro. This did not allow them to devalue their currency to dampen the impact of negative shocks and restore balance to the current account, which ultimately contributed to the European sovereign-debt crisis. Another reason for currency crises usually not following the banking collapses was probably the "liability dollarization" practiced by some countries, since in this case a currency devaluation would cause a considerable increase in the Sovereign debt/GDP ratio, as the debt of such a country would be denominated in US dollars (or another foreign currency) while its assets were denominated in local currency.
