= Mieczysław Wilczek =

Polish politician, chemist, and businessman

Mieczysław Wilczek (25 January 1932 – 30 April 2014) was a Polish politician, chemist, and businessman who was Minister of Industry from 1988 to 1989.
