= Stanisław Gomułka =

Polish-born economist (1940–2026)

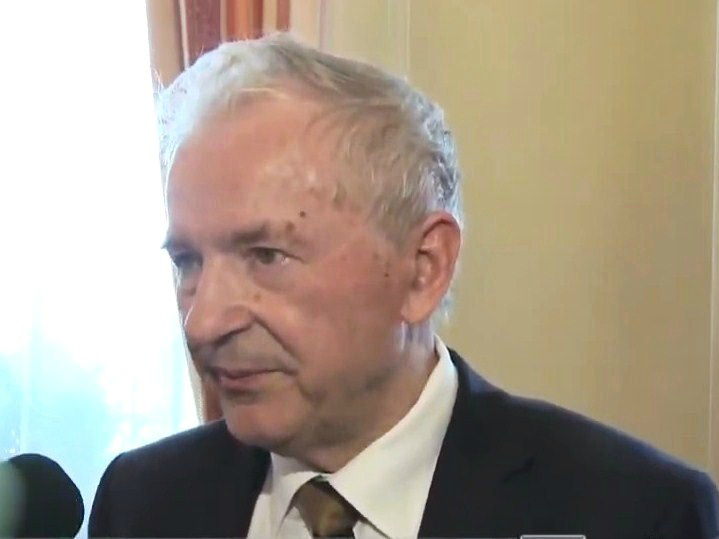
- Gomułka in 2012
- Born: 10 September 1940; Krężoły, General Government
- Died: 18 July 2026 (aged 85)
- Citizenship: Polish
- Education: University of Warsaw: Master degree, PhD
- Occupation: Economist
- Known for: Balcerowicz Plan co-author; Paris Club and London Club debt negotiations; Macroeconomic research on economic growth

Stanisław Gomułka (10 September 1940 – 18 July 2026) was a Polish-born economist.

== Life and career ==
From 1970 up to 2005 a reader in Economics at the London School of Economics, a visiting professor or research fellow at several US universities (Pennsylvania, Stanford, Columbia and Harvard), also at Aarhus university, Netherlands Institute for Advanced Studies and the Central European university, in the years 1989-2002 advisor to the Ministry of Finance and National Bank of Poland, from 2013 a member of the Polish Academy of Sciences.

His research interests were in the fields of endogenous economic growth; economics of technological change; comparative economic systems; reforms and post-communist transition, especially Poland and the former USSR; trade and financial relations between East and West; privatisation and analysis of the behaviour of enterprises in Central Europe, the former USSR and China.

Gomułka died on 18 July 2026, at the age of 85.

== Honours and awards ==
In 2014, he received Officer's Cross of the Order of Polonia Restituta.

== See also ==
- János Kornai
- Grzegorz Kołodko
- Leszek Balcerowicz
