= Popiwek =

Popiwek (an acronym of PPWW, short for Podatek od ponadnormatywnych wypłat wynagrodzeń, Polish: Super-normative wages tax) was a tax introduced in Poland in 1984. Although created by the communist authorities and initially hidden under the name of "Fee for the National Work Activization Fund," it is primarily associated with the 1989 Balcerowicz Plan. It was used as one of the elements that was to fight the hyperinflation (reaching 251%) that struck Poland in the 1980s. It created a state-controlled level of wages that was tied to the level of inflation and taxed all companies that exceeded those wage rise limits. In 1991, the tax was lifted for privately held companies, and the following year, it was withdrawn altogether.
