= Battle of Uchidehama =

1582 battle in Japan

- Part of the Sengoku period
Date	1582
Location	Uchidehama, Japan 34°44′01″N 135°18′55″E
Result	Toyotomi Hideyoshi victory

Belligerents
forces of Akechi Mitsuhide	forces of Toyotomi Hideyoshi

Commanders and leaders
Akechi Mitsuhide	Toyotomi Hideyoshi, Hori Hidemasa
- Location within Japan

The Battle of Uchidehama (打出浜の戦い, Uchidehama no Tatakai) took place in 1582, near Kyoto, Japan, following the Battle of Yamazaki.

The forces of Toyotomi Hideyoshi pursued the defeated Akechi clan to Uchidehama and engaged the clan again there. Akechi Mitsuharu led the Akechi, as his cousin, Mitsuhide, died at Yamazaki. Hori Hidemasa led the Toyotomi forces at Uchidehama, and defeated Akechi Mitsuharu.

Uchidehama was near present-day Ōtsu city, Shiga prefecture outside Kyoto.
