= Internal balance =

Internal balance in economics is a state in which a country maintains full employment and price level stability. It is a function of a country's total output,

II = C (Yf - T) + I + G + CA (E x P*/P, Yf-T; Yf* - T*)

Internal balance = Consumption [determined by disposable income] + Investment + Government Spending + Current Account (determined by the real exchange rate, disposable income of home country and disposable income of the foreign country).

External balance signifies a condition in which the country's current account, its exports minus imports, is neither too far in surplus nor in deficit. It is signified by a level of the current account which is consistent with the maintenance of existing (or growing) levels of consumption, employment and national output over the long term. It is notated by

XX = CA (EP*/P, Y-T, Yf* - T*)

External balance = the right amount of surplus or deficit in the current account.

Maintaining both internal and external balances requires use of both monetary policy and fiscal policy. That is one reason why floating exchange rates may be superior to fixed exchange rates. Under fixed exchange rates, governments are not usually free to employ monetary policy. Under floating rates, countries can use both.

The two variables determining internal and external balances are the real exchange rate and real domestic demand. These fundamental variables can signal certain economic conditions. For example, a real domestic demand surplus or an overly appreciated real exchange rate represents a current account deficit. A country can attain external and internal balance by finding the correct combinations of the real domestic demand level and real exchange rate.
