= Bokun =

- Language: Croatian

Other names
- Variant forms: Bokunić, Bokunović

Bokun is a Slavic surname.

It may refer to:

- Branko Bokun (1920–2011), Croatian-English author
- German Bokun (1922–1978), Belarusian-Soviet Olympic fencer
- Bokkun, a character from the anime series Sonic X

== See also ==
- Bōkun Habanero, a Japanese snackfood
