= Andreas K. Engel =

Andreas Karl Engel (born 1961) is a German neuroscientist. He serves as the director of the Department of Neurophysiology and Pathophysiology at the University Medical Center Hamburg-Eppendorf (UKE).

== Education ==
Engel studied medicine and philosophy at Saarland University in Homburg, at the Technical University of Munich, and Goethe University Frankfurt in Germany. Following completion of his medical licensing examination (German Staatsexamen), he received his Doctor of Medicine (Dr. med.) from the Technical University of Munich in 1987.

== Career ==
From 1987–1995, Engel worked as a post-doctoral fellow with Wolf Singer at the Max Planck Institute for Brain Research in Frankfurt, Germany. Between 1996-2000, he led a research group at the Max Planck Institute for Brain Research funded by the Heisenberg Program of the German Research Foundation (DFG). From fall 1997 to summer 1998, he also held an affiliation as a Daimler-Benz Fellow at the Berlin Institute for Advanced Study.

From 2000-2002, Engel worked at the Jülich Research Centre as head of the Cellular Neurobiology Group at the Institute for Medicine. In 2002, he was appointed to the Chair of Neurophysiology at UKE. He is a member of the Academy of Sciences and Humanities in Hamburg, and a member of the German National Academy of Sciences Leopoldina. From 2011 to 2023, he has served as coordinator of Collaborative Research Centre SFB 936 "Multi-Site Communication in the Brain" (with C. Gerloff, Dept. of Neurology, UKE).

== Research ==
Engel has become known by his work on the "binding problem". His research examines the hypothesis that temporal synchrony serves for dynamic coordination of signals in the brain. In addition to working on the experimental validation of this hypothesis, Engel pursues research on its cognitive and theoretical implications.

During his postdoctoral work with Wolf Singer at the Max Planck Institute, Engel participated in studies demonstrating the relevance of neural synchrony, in particular of so-called gamma waves, for processing perceptual information. The group provided evidence that temporal correlations can facilitate binding of features into coherent sensory representations. Work from Engel's laboratory has also examined relations between neural synchrony and visual awareness, as well as the functional role of neural synchrony for sensorimotor coupling.

In the past 20 years, Engel's group has extended this research to the human brain using EEG and MEG in combination with source modeling techniques. Studies have investigated neuronal oscillations and synchrony in relation to perceptual processing, attention, working memory, decision-making and consciousness. Recent work on interactions among visual, auditory and tactile systems suggests a role of temporal binding in multisensory integration. The group has developed novel methods for electrophysiological analysis of resting state network activity. These approaches have been applied to study of network dysfunction in patients with movement disorders, multiple sclerosis and schizophrenia, as well as research on pain, and altered networks following early sensory deprivation.

Engel also investigates implications of these neurophysiological findings for theories of perception, cognition and action. Recent work examines connections between neural dynamics and enactive approaches to of cognition, including the grounding of cognition in sensorimotor coupling.

== Honors and awards ==
- 1995-2000, Heisenberg-Fellowship, German Research Foundation (DFG)
- 1997-1998 Daimler-Benz Fellowship at the Berlin Institute for Advanced Study, Germany
- 2008, elected as member of the Academy of Sciences and Humanities in Hamburg, Germany
- 2011, award of an ERC Advanced Grant, European Research Council (with P. König, University of Osnabrück)
- 2023, award of a second ERC Advanced Grant, European Research Council
- 2024, elected as member of the National Academy of Sciences Leopoldina, Germany

== Selected publications ==
- Gray CM, König P, Engel AK, Singer W (March 1989). "Oscillatory responses in cat visual cortex exhibit inter-columnar synchronization which reflects global stimulus properties". Nature. 338 (6213): 334–7. doi:10.1038/338334a0. PMID 2922061. S2CID 4281744.
- Engel AK, König P, Kreiter AK, Singer W (May 1991). "Interhemispheric synchronization of oscillatory neuronal responses in cat visual cortex". Science. 252 (5009): 1177–9. doi:10.1126/science.252.5009.1177. PMID 2031188. S2CID 6520820.
- Munk MH, Roelfsema PR, König P, Engel AK, Singer W (April 1996). "Role of reticular activation in the modulation of intracortical synchronization". Science. 272 (5259): 271–4. doi:10.1126/science.272.5259.271. PMID 8602512. S2CID 10399718.
- Roelfsema PR, Engel AK, König P, Singer W (January 1997). "Visuomotor integration is associated with zero time-lag synchronization among cortical areas" (PDF). Nature. 385 (6612): 157–61. doi:10.1038/385157a0. PMID 8990118. S2CID 4352326.
- Engel AK, Fries P, Singer W (October 2001). "Dynamic predictions: oscillations and synchrony in top-down processing". Nature Reviews. Neuroscience. 2 (10): 704–16. doi:10.1038/35094565. PMID 11584308. S2CID 13224138.
- Engel AK, Singer W (January 2001). "Temporal binding and the neural correlates of sensory awareness". Trends in Cognitive Sciences. 5 (1): 16–25. doi:10.1016/S1364-6613(00)01568-0. PMID 11164732. S2CID 11922975.
- Womelsdorf T, Schoffelen JM, Oostenveld R, et al. (June 2007). "Modulation of neuronal interactions through neuronal synchronization" (PDF). Science. 316 (5831): 1609–12. doi:10.1126/science.1139597. hdl:11858/00-001M-0000-0010-1AFC-D. PMID 17569862. S2CID 32612600.
- Siegel M, Donner TH, Oostenveld R, Fries P, Engel AK (November 2008). "Neuronal synchronization along the dorsal visual pathway reflects the focus of spatial attention". Neuron. 60 (4): 709–19. doi:10.1016/j.neuron.2008.09.010. hdl:2066/71012. PMID 19038226. S2CID 19010227.
- Donner TH, Siegel M, Fries P, Engel AK (September 2009). "Buildup of choice-predictive activity in human motor cortex during perceptual decision making". Current Biology. 19 (18): 1581–5. doi:10.1016/j.cub.2009.07.066. hdl:1721.1/96198. PMID 19747828. S2CID 7070852.
- Hipp JF, Engel AK, Siegel M (January 2011). "Oscillatory synchronization in large-scale cortical networks predicts perception". Neuron. 69 (2): 387–96. doi:10.1016/j.neuron.2010.12.027. hdl:1721.1/92314. PMID 21262474. S2CID 7658076.
- Supp GG, Siegel M, Hipp JF, Engel AK (December 2011). "Cortical hypersynchrony predicts breakdown of sensory processing during loss of consciousness". Current Biology. 21 (23): 1988–93. doi:10.1016/j.cub.2011.10.017. hdl:1721.1/92041. PMID 22100063.
- Siegel M, Donner TH, Engel AK (February 2012). "Spectral fingerprints of large-scale neuronal interactions". Nature Reviews. Neuroscience. 13 (2): 121–34. doi:10.1038/nrn3137. PMID 22233726. S2CID 8756808.
- Hipp JF, Hawellek DJ, Corbetta M, Siegel M, Engel AK (June 2012). "Large-scale cortical correlation structure of spontaneous oscillatory activity". Nature Neuroscience. 15 (6): 884–90. doi:10.1038/nn.3101. PMC 3861400. PMID 22561454.
- Engel AK, Maye A, Kurthen M, König P (May 2013). "Where's the action? The pragmatic turn in cognitive science". Trends in Cognitive Sciences. 17 (5): 202–9. doi:10.1016/j.tics.2013.03.006. PMID 23608361. S2CID 16057054.
- Engel AK, Gerloff C, Hilgetag CC, Nolte G (November 2013). "Intrinsic coupling modes: multiscale interactions in ongoing brain activity". Neuron. 80 (4): 867–86. doi:10.1016/j.neuron.2013.09.038. PMID 24267648.
- Senkowski D, Engel AK (September 2024). „Multi-timescale neural dynamics for multisensory integration“. Nature Reviews Neuroscience 25 (9): 625–42. doi:10.1038/s41583-024-00845-7. PMID 39090214
