= Ruxandra Sireteanu =

Romanian biophysicist, neuroscientist and academic

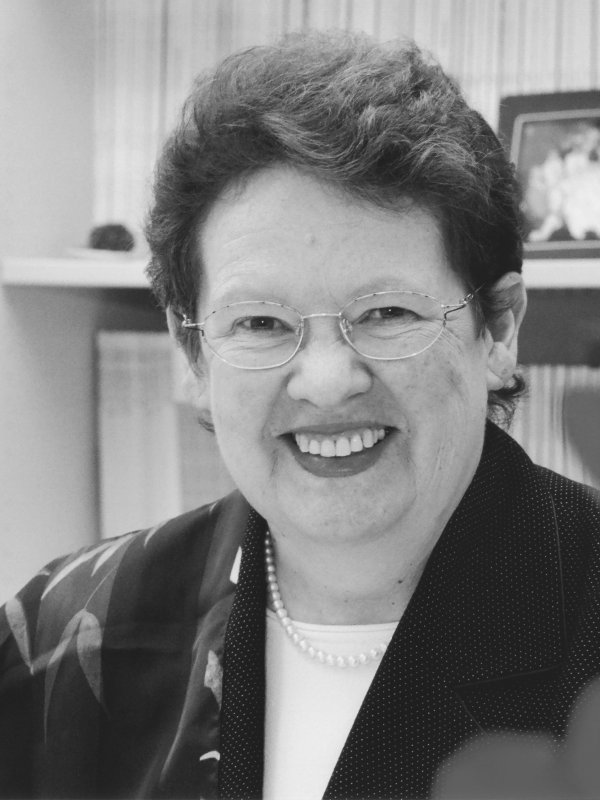
- Ruxandra Sireteanu in January 2006 in Frankfurt am Main
- Born: 19 September 1945; Mediaș, Romania
- Died: 8 September 2008 (aged 62); Frankfurt am Main, Germany
- Education: University of Bucharest; Scuola Normale Superiore di Pisa
- Known for: Research into amblyopia
- Spouse: Dan H. Constantinescu
- Children: Sorin and Laura
- Scientific career
- Fields: Behavioral neuroscience, biophysics and neuroscience
- Workplaces: University of Ulm; University of Lausanne; Max Planck Institute of Psychiatry; Max Planck Institute for Brain Research; Goethe University Frankfurt
- Theses: Contributions to the Study of the Visual Function, using Spatially Periodical Stimuli (1976); Development and Plasticity of Visual functions: Psychophysical, Electrophysiological and Clinical studies (1990)

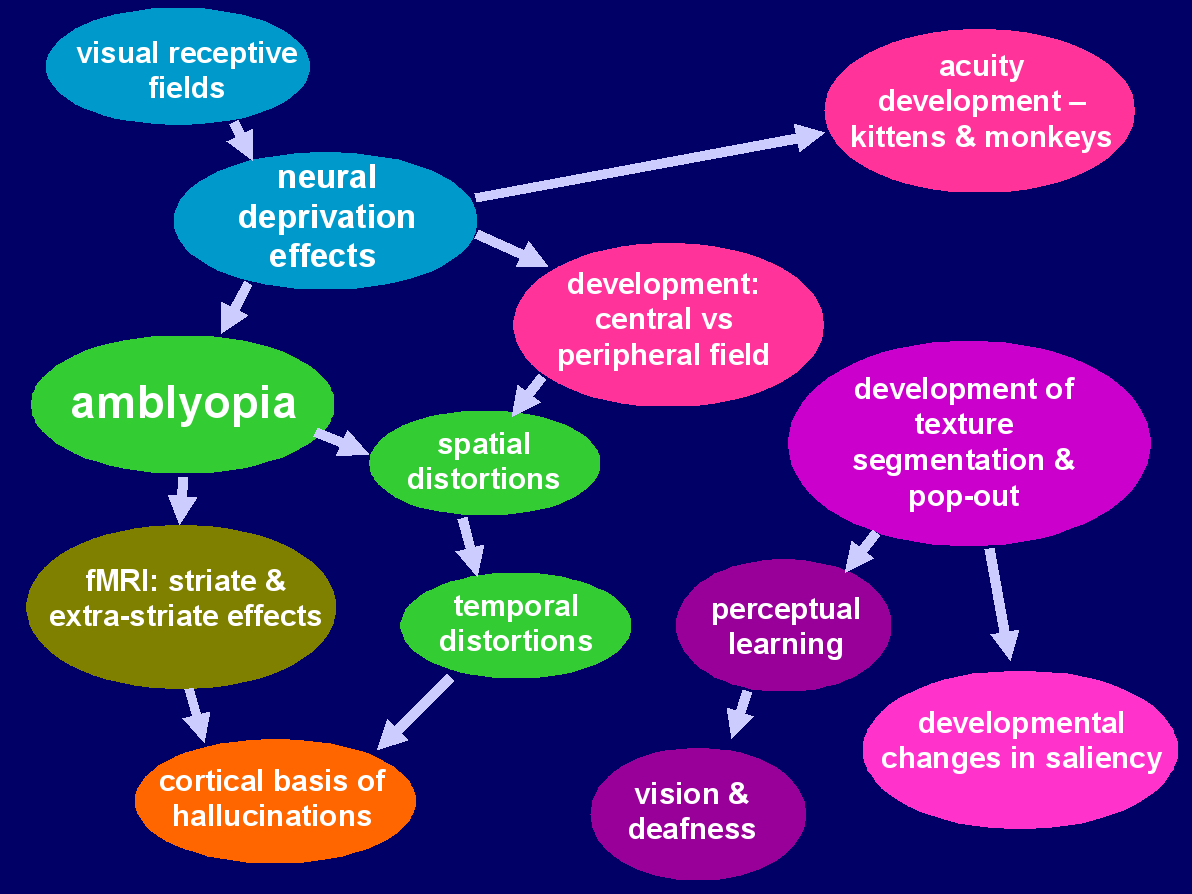
Fields of research contributed to by Ruxandra Sireteanu

Ruxandra Sireteanu (19 September 1945 – 8 September 2008), also known after her marriage as Ruxandra Sireteanu-Constantinescu, was a Romanian biophysicist and neuroscientist who undertook pioneering research into the human visual system. Born in Romania, she initially studied at the University of Bucharest. She then undertook research in Pisa in Italy and Lausanne in Switzerland before moving to Germany, first joining the Max Planck Institute of Psychiatry in Munich to work with Wolf Singer, and then the University of Ulm. In 1978, she moved to Frankfurt, initially to join the local Max Planck Institute for Brain Research before inaugurating the chair in Biological Psychology at Goethe University, which she held from 1999. She also held visiting positions at universities in the United States, including the University of California, Berkeley. Her research centred on the way that the visual system developed in people from their birth into adulthood, for which she studied both healthy individuals and, particularly, those with disorders like amblyopia.

== Biography ==
Ruxandra Sireteanu was born in Mediaș, Romania, on 19 September 1945. She entered the University of Bucharest in 1963 and graduated in physics in 1968 with a thesis entitled Romanian: Aspecte teoretice și experimentale ale potențialului de repaus membranar (Theoretical and Experimental Aspects of the Resting Membrane Potential). She then joined the Center for Radiobiology and Molecular Biology as a researcher, subsequently being appointed assistant professor at the Institute of Oil, Gas and Geology in Bucharest. She attended the Scuola Normale Superiore di Pisa for her doctorate study from 1972, defending her thesis in biophysics "Contributions to the Study of the Visual Function, using Spatially Periodicals" in 1976, and then undertook postdoctoral research at the Universities of Ulm and Lausanne. In 1978, she joined the Max Planck Institute of Psychiatry in Munich, Germany, where she worked as part of Wolf Singer's team.

Sireteanu took up the role of leading the team at the Max Planck Institute for Brain Research in Frankfurt am Main from 1984. At the same time, she was offered a visiting position at University of California, Berkeley, in 1983, and was named Greenman-Petty Professor at the University of Texas Health Science Center at Houston in 1987. In 1990, she successfully defended her habilitation thesis in neuroscience entitled "Development and Plasticity of Visual functions: Psychophysical, Electrophysiological and Clinical Studies". She was subsequently presented with awards from the Heinz and Helene Adam Stiftung for Excellence in Research in Ophthalmology in 1991 and from the Bielschowsky Society for Research in Strabismus in 1994.

In 1995, Sireteanu began working with the Goethe University Frankfurt, and drew together a collaboration between the university and the local Max Planck Institute for Brain Research focusing on behavioral neuroscience that ultimately led to the creation of a chair in Biological Psychology in 1999. Sireteanu was the first appointee. Her research centred on studies of the way that the human visual system develops from a newborn baby into adulthood, both for healthy individuals and those with disorders in their binocular vision, including amblyopia. She published extensively, often in English, in journals like Vision Research where she was also appointed co-editor.

She supervised doctoral students and was known for her approach to mentoring that emphasized creativity and academic rigor. After more than a decade working in Frankfurt, she accepted an invitation to give a lecture on recent developments in the understanding of amblyopia at the Department of Biophysics of the Carol Davila University of Medicine and Pharmacy in Bucharest, traveling there in mid-2008. This was her final visit to her country of birth. She died on 8 September 2008, leaving behind her husband, Dan H. Constantinescu, and two children, Sorin and Laura.

== Selected publications ==
Sireteanu published over 60 original research papers and chapters, which included the following:

- Fronius, M. & Sireteanu, R. (1989). Monocular geometry is selectively distorted in the central visual-field of strasbismic amblyopes. Investigative Ophthalmology & Visual Science, 30 (9), 2034–2044.
- Hoffmann, K. & Sireteanu, R. (1977). Interlaminar differences in effects of early and late monocular deprivation on visual acuity of cells in lateral geniculate nucleus of cat. Neuroscience Letters, 5 (3-4), 171–175.
- Lagreze, W., & Sireteanu, R. (1991). 2-Dimensional spatial distortions in human strabismic amblyopia. Vision Research, 31 (7-8), 1271–1288.
- Muckli, L., S. Kiess, N. Tonhausen, W. Singer, R. Goebel & R. Sireteanu (2006) Cerebral correlates of impaired grating perception in individual, psychophysically assessed human amblyopes. Vision Research, 46, 506-526
- Rettenbach, R., Diller, G. & Sireteanu, R. (1999). Do deaf people see better? Texture segmentation and visual search compensate in adult but not in juvenile subjects. Journal of Cognitive Neuroscience, 11 (5), 560–583.
- Roelfsema, P., Konig, P., Engel, A., Sireteanu, R. & Singer, W. (1994). Reduced synchronization in the visual cortex of cats with strabismic smblyopia. European Journal of Neuroscience, 6 (11), 1645–1655.
- Sireteanu, R. (1982). Binocular vision in strabismic humans with alternating fixation. Vision Research, 22 (8), 889–896.
- Sireteanu, R. (1996). "The development of the visual field: results from human and animal studies"; în F. Vital-Durand, J. Atkinson & O. J. Braddick (ed.): Infant Vision, Oxford: Oxford University Press, pp. 17–31, ISBN 9780198523161.
- Sireteanu, R. (2000). "The binocular act in strabismus"; în G. Lennerstrand și J. Ygge (ed.): Advances in Strabismus Research: Basic and Clinical Aspects, London: Portland Press, pp. 63–83, ISBN 1855781441.
- Sireteanu, R. (2001). "Development of the visual system in the human infant"; în A.F. Kalverboer & A. Gramsberger (ed.):Handbook of Brain and Behaviour in Human Development, London: Kluwer Academic Publishers, pp. 629–653, ISBN 0792369432.
- Sireteanu R., Bäumer C.C. & Iftime A. (2008) Temporal instability in amblyopic vision: relationship to a displacement map of visual space. Investigative Ophthalmology & Visual Science, 49(9), 3940–3954.
- Sireteanu, R. & Fronius, M. (1981). Naso-temporal asymmetries in human amblyopia - Consequence of long-term interocular suppression. Vision Research, 21 (7), 1055–1063.
- Sireteanu, R., Fronius, M. & Singer, W. (1981). Binocular interaction in the peripheral visual field of humans with strabismic and anisometropic amblyopia. Vision Research, 21 (7), 1065–1074.
- Sireteanu, R., & Hoffmann, K. (1979). Relative frequency and visual resolution of X-cell and Y-cell in the LGN of normal and monocularly deprived cats - interlaminar differences. Experimental Brain Research, 34 (3), 591–603.
- Sireteanu, R., Lagreze, W., & Constantinescu, D. (1993). Distortions in 2-Dimensional visual space-perception in strabismic observers. Vision Research, 33 (5-6), 677–690.
- Sireteanu, R., & Rettenbach, R. (1995). Perceptual-learning in visual-search - Fast, enduring, but nonspecific. Vision Research, 35 (14), 2037–2043.
- Sireteanu, R., & Rieth, C. (1992). Texture segregation in infants and children. Behavioural Brain Research, 49 (1), 133–139.
- Sireteanu, R., Singer, W. & Rieth, C. (1992). Texture segregation based online orientation develops late in childhood; în S. F. Wright & R. Groner (ed.): Facets of dyslexia and its remediation, Amsterdam: North-Holland, pp. 3–12, ISBN 0444899499.
