= Helga E. Rafelski =

German particle physicist

Helga Rafelski
- Born: Helga Ernestine Betz; September 3, 1949
- Died: November 5, 2000 (aged 51); Tucson, Arizona
- Education: Cape Town University, University of Illinois at Chicago
- Spouse: Johann Rafelski
- Children: Marc Rafelski, Susanne Rafelski
- Scientific career
- Workplaces: Goethe-Universität Frankfurt am Main
- Thesis: Muon regeneration in muon catalyzed dt-fusion (1988)
- Doctoral advisor: Raoul D. Viollier

Helga Ernestine Rafelski, (née Betz) (3 September 1949 – 5 November 2000) was a German particle physicist. She got her professional degree from Goethe-Universität Frankfurt am Main, her master's degree from University of Illinois at Chicago in 1977 and her PhD from University of Cape Town in 1988 under the advisement of Raoul D. Viollier. She studied muon-catalysed fusion and relativistic heavy-ion collisions.

Returning from South Africa, Rafelski held a visiting position at Goethe-Universität Frankfurt am Main where she worked with Berndt Müller. In-between other appointments she was a scientific associate at CERN in the Data Handling Division.

Her last position was as a computer science teacher at Catalina Foothills High School in Tucson.

Helga Rafelski died of cancer in November 2000 in Tucson, Arizona.
