= Julijana Gjorgjieva =

Macedonian-German professor

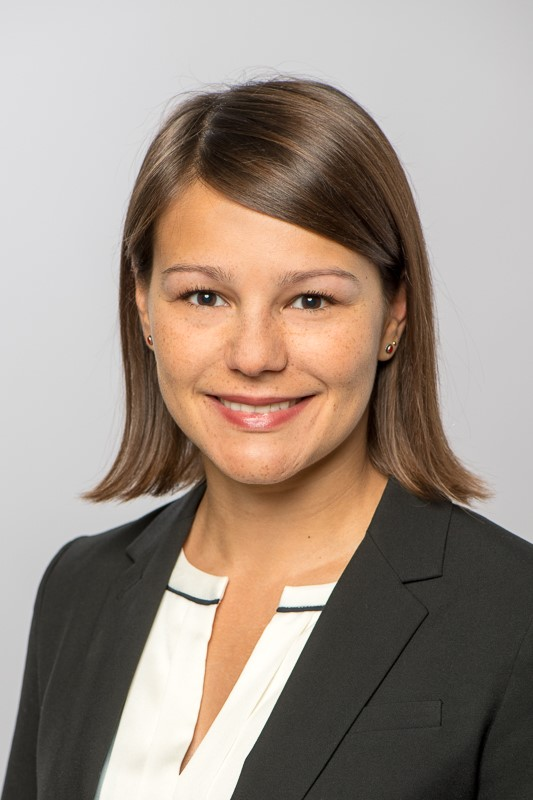
Julijana Gjorgjieva in February 2021

Julijana Gjorgjieva is a Macedonian-German professor of computational neuroscience at the Technical University of Munich and a research group leader at the Max Planck Institute for Brain Research. Her laboratory studies neural circuit formation.

== Life ==
Gjorgjieva was born in Kavadarci in North Macedonia, formerly known as Macedonia. As a junior in high school, Gjorgjieva participated in a year-long exchange with the Hill School in Pennsylvania, through the American Secondary Schools for International Students and Teachers (ASSIST).

After completing high school, Gjorgjieva earned her undergraduate degree in mathematics at Harvey Mudd College and conducted research in mathematical biology, specifically analyzing the susceptible, infected recovered (SIR) models and vaccination strategies for SARS. Gjorgjieva then completed her master's degree in mathematics and a Ph.D. in applied mathematics at the University of Cambridge in the United Kingdom. For her first postdoctoral program, Gjorgjieva conducted research at Harvard University. She completed the final two years of her postdoc at Brandeis University in the lab of Eve Marder.

== Academic career ==
Gjorgjieva's research group studies how spontaneous activity in neural circuits lead to the refinement of sensory systems, how are these systems maintained post-development and after perturbations, and, lastly, how the neural networks being studied affect motor behavior.

== Awards ==
Gjorgjieva has received numerous awards for her work in computational neuroscience. In 2021, Gjorgjieva was selected as a FENS-Kavli Scholar by the FENS-Kavli Network of Excellence for her work in theoretical neuroscience In 2018, Gjorgjieva was awarded the Peter und Traudl Engelhorn Stiftung Research Prize in “Computational Biology." In 2017, Gjorgjieva was awarded the NARSAD Young Investigator Award from the Brain and Behavior Research Foundation. In 2021, Gjorgjieva was awarded the Eric Kandel Young Neuroscientists Prize.
