= Pascal Fries =

German neurophysiologist

Pascal Fries (born January 28, 1972) is a German neurophysiologist.

== Vita ==
Pascal Fries was born in St. Ingbert. He studied medicine from 1991 to 1993 at the University of Saarland and from 1993 at the Johann Wolfgang Goethe University Frankfurt am Main, where he completed his medical studies in 1998 with the state examination. For his doctoral thesis, he worked from 1993 to 1998 in the department of Prof. Wolf Singer at the Max Planck Institute for Brain Research in Frankfurt and received his PhD in 2000 from the Johann Wolfgang Goethe University. From 1999 to 2001 he was a postdoctoral fellow in the laboratory of Dr. Robert Desimone in the National Institute of Mental Health in Bethesda in the USA. From 2001 to 2009 he was Principal Investigator at the Donders Centre for Cognitive Neuroimaging of the Radboud University Nijmegen in the Netherlands, where he also held a professorship from 2008 to 2024. In 2008 he became a scientific member of the Max Planck Society and began in 2009 the work as managing director of the Ernst Strüngmann Institute (ESI) for Neuroscience in collaboration with the Max Planck Society in Frankfurt. Since 2024, Pascal Fries is a Research Group Leader at the Max Planck Institute for Biological Cybernetics.

== Honors and awards ==
- 1991–1998: Scholarship from the German National Academic Foundation
- 1999–2001: Postdoctoral membership at the German National Academic Foundation (BASF)
- 2000: Graduate (Summa cum laude) at the Goethe-University Frankfurt, medical specialty
- 2001: Award for the best dissertation of 2000, Johann Wolfgang Goethe-Universität Frankfurt am Main, medical specialty
- 2003: „VIDI“ Award for career development from the Netherlands Organization for Scientific Research (NWO)
- 2006: EURYI (European Young Investigator) Award from the European Science Foundation
- 2006: Membership in The Young Academy of The Royal Netherlands Academy of Arts and Sciences
- 2007: Bernhard Katz prize
- 2008: Boehringer Ingelheim FENS (Federation of European Neuroscience Societies) Research Award
