= Australian Institute of Family Studies =

Australian government agency

- AIFS

Agency overview
- Formed: 1980
- Employees: 82
- Parent agency: Department of Social Services
- Website: www.aifs.gov.au

The Australian Institute of Family Studies (AIFS) is an Australian Government statutory agency in the Department of Social Services. It is located in Melbourne, Victoria, Australia. Its role is to conduct research and communicate findings that affect family wellbeing to policy makers, service providers and the broader community.

== History ==
The Australian Institute of Family Studies was established in February 1980. Born largely out of concerns about the possible effects of no-fault divorce, the inclusion of an Institute of Family Studies (as it was then known) had been an eleventh hour amendment to the Bill which helped to get the Family Law Act 1975 over the final hurdle of a Parliamentary debate which had lasted more than 18 months.

The foundation Director of AIFS was Don Edgar. Other former Directors include Harry McGurk, David Stanton and Alan Hayes.

AIFS’ first major study was the Australian Family Formation Project, which commenced in 1981. Other key studies in the early years included the Children in Families Study, the Cost of Children Study and the Economic Consequences of Marital Breakdown Study. This study was influential in demonstrating the need for an Australian child support scheme, which was subsequently introduced in 1988. Further research conducted by AIFS was instrumental in providing the evidence base for the major changes to the scheme that were made in 2006.

Emerging issues in the late '80s and early '90s that AIFS focused on included work and family, early childhood, and family law. Broader concerns regarding economic and social wellbeing led to the creation of the Australian Living Standards Study.

In 2000, AIFS became the host of the Australian Temperament Project, a large longitudinal study of children’s development that began in 1983. The study investigates pathways to psychosocial adjustment across childhood and adolescence, and results from the study have been published extensively in scientific journals. The Growing Up in Australia: Longitudinal Study of Australian Children commenced in 2004, a major study following the development of 10,000 children and families from all parts of Australia. The study is investigating the contribution of children’s social, economic and cultural environments to their adjustment and wellbeing.

The National Child Protection Clearinghouse was transferred to AIFS from the Australian Institute of Criminology in 1995. Research on child protection issues has been used in reviews of Australian Child Protection systems, such as the Special Commission of Inquiry into Child Protection Services in New South Wales, Australia.

AIFS has also undertaken an extensive evaluation of the 2006 family law reforms.

== Research Program ==
AIFS reviews its research directions every three years. The current research directions (2012-2015) focus on the following themes:

1. family change, functioning and wellbeing
2. social and economic participation for families
3. child and family safety
4. services to support families

== Research Communication ==
AIFS communicates the findings of its research and analysis via:

- website, including reports on programs and activities; access to publications; information from databases and resource collections.
- webinar series and biennial conference
- information services, including a library that contains a substantial and up-to-date collection of international and Australian research on family wellbeing in Australia.

=== Publications ===
- Family Matters (1987– 2018)
- Australian Family Relationships Clearinghouse Issues, aka AFRC Issues (2007– 2011): 'in-depth papers that focus on policy and research topics relevant to family relationships'

Other publications, including but not limited to:

- CFCA Papers
- CFCA Resource Sheets

== Advisory Council ==
As of 1 July 2013, the AIFS Advisory Council is composed of:

- Brian Howe (Chair)
- Muriel Bamblett
- Richard Chisholm
- Ross Homel
- Barbara Pocock
- Paul Ronalds
- Dorothy Scott
- Paul Smyth
- Serena Wilson (Deputy Secretary, Department of Social Services)
