= Harry McGurk =

British cognitive psychologist

- Born: 26 February 1936; Glasgow, Scotland
- Died: 17 April 1998 (aged 62); Melbourne, Australia
- Spouse: Betty Hannah

Academic background
- Education: University of Strathclyde

Academic work
- Discipline: Cognitive psychology
- Institutions: University of Surrey; Australian Institute of Family Studies

Harry McGurk (23 February 1936 – 17 April 1998) was a British cognitive psychologist. He is known for his discovery of the McGurk effect, described in a 1976 paper with his research assistant John MacDonald, while he was a senior developmental psychologist at the University of Surrey.

== Biography ==
McGurk was born in Hillington, Glasgow on 23 February 1936. After training at the University of Glasgow, he became a probation officer in Edinburgh.

He married Betty Hannah. She was invited to go out to the Church of Scotland mission in Nigeria to use her accountancy skills and for two years he became involved with the management of the school and hospital.

On their return, he studied psychology at University of Strathclyde, gaining a BA, an MSc, and a PhD for his seminal work on infant perception.

Following a period as a Research Fellow at Princeton University, he joined the University of Surrey, as a lecturer in child development and later was appointed to a personal chair in the same subject.

Between 1990 and 1994 he was Director of the Thomas Coram Research Unit at the Institute of Education, University of London. In 1994, he was appointed as Director of the Australian Institute of Family Studies in Melbourne.

Harry McGurk died on 17 April 1998, in Melbourne, aged 62, from complications after a heart operation.

== Publications ==
- The economic cost of child abuse and neglect in South Australia. 1998
- Staff-child ratios in care and education services for young children. 1995
- Project Charlie : an evaluation of a life skills drug education programme for primary schools. 1995
- Childhood social development : contemporary perspectives / edited by Harry McGurk. 1992
- Developmental psychology and the vision of speech. 1988
- What next? 1987
- Brain and behavioural development: interdisciplinary perspectives on structure and function / edited by Harry McGurk and John W. T. Dickerson. 1982
- Issues in childhood social development / edited by Harry McGurk. 1978
- Ecological factors in human development by International Society for the Study of Behavioural Development. Conference (3rd: 1975: University of Surrey). 1977
- Growing and changing : a primer of developmental psychology. 1975
- PhD Thesis: Oriental discrimination in infancy and early childhood. University of Strathclyde. Dept. of Psychology. Thesis, 1971
