= Johann Rafelski =

German-American theoretical physicist

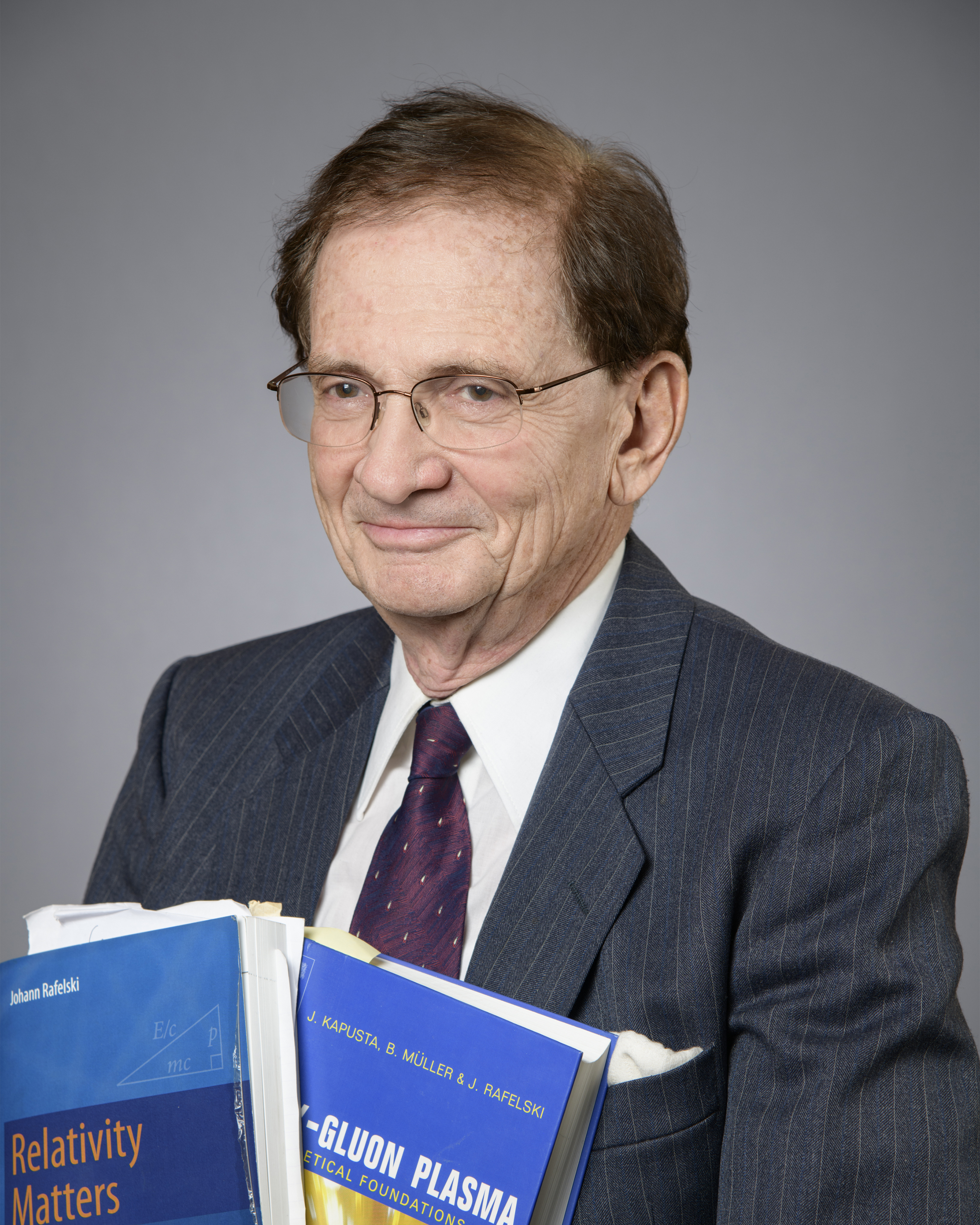
- Born: 19 May 1950 (age 76); Kraków, Poland
- Education: Goethe University Frankfurt
- Known for: Structure of the Vacuum State and Energy in Strong External Field quantum electrodynamics and quantum chromodynamics, Muon-catalyzed fusion, Hadronization and Hagedorn temperature, Deconfinement of quarks (QGP) in relativistic heavy ion collisions, Strangeness as signature of quark–gluon plasma, quark matter
- Spouses: Helga Betz (m. 1973; died 2000) Victoria Grossack (m. 2003)
- Children: Marc Rafelski, Susanne Rafelski
- Scientific career
- Fields: Physicist
- Workplaces: University of Arizona
- Doctoral advisor: Walter Greiner

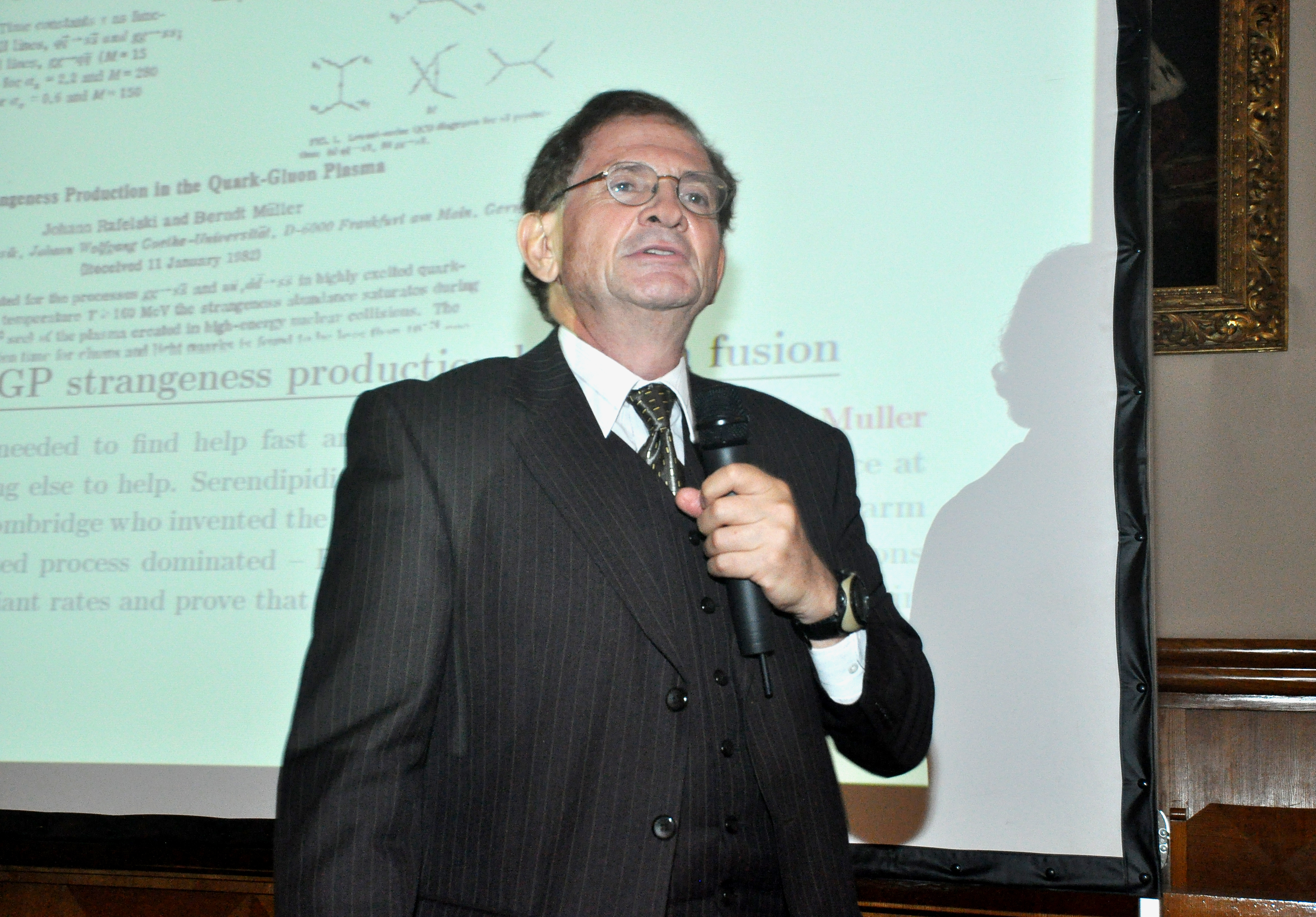
Johann Rafelski lecturing at the International Conference on Strangeness in Quark Matter in 2011.

Johann Rafelski (born 19 May 1950) is a German-American theoretical physicist. He is a professor of physics at the University of Arizona in Tucson, guest scientist at CERN (Geneva), and has been LMU-Excellent Guest Professor at LMU Munich in Germany.

Rafelski's current research interests center around investigation of the vacuum structure of quantum chromodynamics (QCD) and quantum electrodynamics (QED) in the presence of strong fields; study of the QCD vacuum structure and deconfinement with strange particle production in deconfined quark–gluon plasma formed in relativistic heavy ion collisions; the formation of matter out of quark–gluon plasma in the hadronization process, also in the early Universe; considering antimatter formation and annihilation. He has also contributed to the physics of table top muon-catalyzed fusion and the ascent of ultrashort laser light pulses as a new tool in this domain of physics. He contributed to understanding of neural nets and artificial intelligence showing importance of neural plasticity and "sleep".

== Career ==
Rafelski studied physics at Goethe University Frankfurt in Germany, where he received his PhD in the spring of 1973 working with Walter Greiner on strong fields and muonic atom tests of QED. In 1973, he began a series of postdoctoral fellowships: first at the University of Pennsylvania (Philadelphia) with Abraham Klein, then at the Argonne National Laboratory near Chicago where he worked with John W. Clark of Washington University in St. Louis and Michael Danos of National Bureau of Standards (now NIST). In the spring of 1977, Rafelski moved for a few months to work at the GSI Helmholtz Centre for Heavy Ion Research in Germany, then continued on to a fellowship at CERN where he worked with Rolf Hagedorn and John S. Bell; Rafelski remains associated with CERN to this day.

In the fall of 1979, Rafelski was appointed tenured associate professor at Goethe University Frankfurt where he taught for 4 years, while collaborating closely with Hagedorn, Berndt Müller and Gerhard Soff, whom Rafelski mentored in his PhD work. Rafelski then accepted the chair of Theoretical Physics at the University of Cape Town (South Africa) where he created a Theoretical Physics and Astrophysics Institute before moving to The University of Arizona in the fall of 1987. During these years he was also a guest scientist at NIST in Washington, D.C. His interests in muon-catalyzed fusion and other table-top fusion methods led him to a collaboration led by Steven E. Jones working at the Los Alamos National Laboratory. The start-up of experimental work on quark–gluon plasma has led to another enduring collaboration with the University of Paris 7-Jussieu involving Jean Letessier.

Rafelski has remained involved in the study of quark–gluon plasma (QGP) and advancing strangeness production as the pivotal QGP signature, for which the first experimental evidence was announced by CERN in February 2000 and which has now become a new field of physics. This work relates to his long-lasting studies of the structured quantum vacuum, also known as Lorentz Invariant Aether.

== Melting Hadrons, Boiling Quarks ==
Melting Hadrons, Boiling Quarks is a scientific book series edited by Rafelski. The first volume of 2016 published as open-access under the Creative Commons license 4.0. is subtitled 'From Hagedorn Temperature to ultra-relativistic heavy-ion collisions at CERN', and the volume in preparation was subtitled 'Quark–gluon plasma discovery at CERN'. In the foreword of the first volume, former director-general of CERN Herwig Schopper states that the book fulfills two purposes which have been neglected for a long time. Primarily a festschrift (an 'honorary book'), it "...delivers the proper credit to physicist Rolf Hagedorn for his important role at the birth of a new research field"; and it describes how a development which he started just 50 years ago is "...closely connected to the most recent surprises in the new experimental domain of relativistic heavy ion physics...".

== Honors, decorations, awards and distinctions ==
- Fellow of the American Physical Society (2011)
- Foreign member of the Academia Europaea (2021)
- Honorary member of the Hungarian Academy of Sciences (2022)

== Private life ==
Rafelski was born in Kraków, Poland, on May 19, 1950. In 1973 Rafelski married Helga Betz, with whom he had two children. Dr. Helga Rafelski died of cancer in 2000. In 2003 Rafelski married the American novelist Victoria Grossack.

== Bibliography ==
- 2020: Spezielle Relativitätstheorie heute.
- 2016: Melting Hadrons, Boiling Quarks - From Hagedorn Temperature to Ultra-Relativistic Heavy-Ion Collisions at CERN.
- 2017: Relativity Matters: From Einstein's EMC2 to Laser Particle Acceleration and Quark–Gluon Plasma.
- 2002: Hadrons and Quark–Gluon Plasma.
- 1996: Die Struktur des Vakuums. Ein Dialog über das 'Nichts'.
- 1992: Spezielle Relativitätstheorie.
- 1985: Quantum Electrodynamics of Strong Fields.
