= Paul Smyth (academic) =

- Born: 1947 (age 78–79)

Academic background
- Education: University of New South Wales Murdoch University

Academic work
- Discipline: Social policy
- Institutions: University of Melbourne

Paul Smyth (born 1947) is a professor of social policy in the School of Social and Political Sciences, Faculty of Arts at the University of Melbourne.

== Education and early career ==
Smyth initially trained as a Roman Catholic priest. Smyth then completed a Bachelor of Arts (Honours) from Murdoch University in Perth, and a Doctor of Philosophy at the University of New South Wales. Smyth was a senior researcher at Uniya, a Jesuit social research and action centre in Sydney established by Frank Brennan. Paul was then Director of Social Policy and Research and Development at the School of Social Work and Social Policy at the University of Queensland.

== University of Melbourne ==
The University of Melbourne appointed Smyth a Professorial Fellow of Social Policy in July 2003, with responsibility for overseeing the Master of Social Policy programme. In a joint-appointment with the Brotherhood of St Laurence, from 2004 until 2013, Smyth was also the General Manager of the Research and Policy Centre at the Brotherhood in Melbourne. During this time, Smyth gave the 2007 Foenander Lecture and the 2013 Sambell Oration.

Smyth remains the Course Co-ordinator for the Master of Social Policy at the University.

== Other appointments ==
In May 2008, Smyth was appointed to the Department of Social Services's Australian Institute of Family Studies Advisory Council and was reappointed in 2009. Smyth also sat on the advisory board of the University of South Australia Centre for Work + Life and is a member of the Australian Catholic Social Justice Council (part of the Australian Catholic Bishops Conference). Smyth is a member of the Grattan Institute's Productivity Growth Program Reference Group and is an External Thought Leader to The Wyatt Trust. Smyth sat on the Editorial Board of the British Journal of Interdisciplinary Studies. Smyth previously sat on the Volunteer Research Agenda Advisory Group at Volunteering Australia.

Jenny Macklin, the Australian Shadow Minister for Disability Reform, appointed Smyth in 2014 to advise on social policy reform in the Australian Labor Party.

== Publications ==
Smyth's commentary is featured in publications including the Australian Broadcasting Corporation's The Drum, The Conversation, Crikey, and Eureka Street among others.

=== Selected books ===
- 2014, Social Policy in Australia, 3rd edition, Smyth, P. & McClelland, A. (eds), Oxford University Press, ISBN 9780195552812
- 2013, Inclusive Growth in Australia, Smyth, P & Buchanan, J., Allen & Unwin, ISBN 9781743311301
- 2005, Community and local governance in Australia, Smyth, P. & Reddel, T., Jones, A. (eds), UNSW Press, ISBN 978-0-86840-775-3
- 2004, Social policy and the Commonwealth: prospects for social inclusion, Smyth, P. & Jones Finer, C (eds), Palgrave Macmillan, ISBN 978-1-4039-2166-6
- 1998, Contesting the Australian way : states, markets and civil society, Smyth, P. & Cass, B. (eds), Cambridge University Press, ISBN 978-0-521-63306-2
- 1994, Australian Social Policy the Keynesian Chapter, Smyth, P, [UNSW Press], ISBN 0-86840-262-1
