= Walter Greiner =

German physicist

- Born: 29 October 1935; Neuenbau, Germany
- Died: 6 October 2016 (aged 80)
- Education: Technische Universität Darmstadt (BS, MSc); University of Freiburg (PhD)
- Known for: Greiner's physics books
- Awards: Max Born Prize (1974); Otto Hahn Prize (1982)
- Scientific career
- Fields: Particle physics
- Workplaces: Goethe University Frankfurt; Frankfurt Institute for Advanced Studies
- Thesis: Die Kernpolarisation in μ-Mesoatomen
- Doctoral advisor: Hans Marschall
- Doctoral students: Berndt Müller; Johann Rafelski; Horst Stöcker

Walter Greiner (29 October 1935 – 6 October 2016) was a German theoretical physicist and professor of the Goethe University Frankfurt. His research interests lay in atomic physics, heavy ion physics, nuclear physics, elementary particle physics (particularly in quantum electrodynamics and quantum chromodynamics). He is known for his series of books in theoretical physics, particularly in Germany but also around the world.

== Biography ==
Walter Greiner was born on 29 October 1935, in Neuenbau, district of Sonneberg, Germany.

He studied physics at the Technische Universität Darmstadt receiving a BSci in physics, a master's degree in 1960 with a thesis on plasma reactors working with Otto Scherzer. Greiner obtained his PhD in 1961 at the University of Freiburg under Hans Marschall, with a thesis titled Nuclear polarization in muonic atoms (German: Die Kernpolarisation in μ-Mesoatomen). From 1962 to 1964, he was assistant professor at the University of Maryland, followed by a Research Associate position at the University of Freiburg in 1964.

Starting in 1965, he became a full professor at the Institute for Theoretical Physics at Goethe University Frankfurt until 1995.

Greiner has been a visiting professor to many universities and laboratories, including Florida State University, the University of Virginia, the University of California, the University of Melbourne, Vanderbilt University, Yale University, Oak Ridge National Laboratory, and Los Alamos National Laboratory.

In 2003, with Wolf Singer, he was the founding Director of the Frankfurt Institute for Advanced Studies (FIAS), and gave lectures and seminars in elementary particle physics. He died on 6 October 2016 at the age of 80.

After Greiner's death, several books and articles were published as tributes to him.

== Graduate students ==
His doctoral students include Berndt Müller, Johann Rafelski and Horst Stöcker.

== Awards ==
Greiner has received numerous scientific awards, including the Max Born Prize in 1974, the Otto Hahn Prize in 1982, and the Alexander von Humboldt Medal. Many of his students are holders of chairs at home and abroad or employees at renowned scientific institutions.

== Books ==
Greiner's books cover most of theoretical physics, although there are more in the areas of his research (quantum mechanics and field theory, with applications). The following are the English translations of the books. See the German Wikipedia for the original German editions (which include a volume on hydrodynamics, not published in the English series).

Classical theoretical physics series

- W. Greiner (2004). Classical Mechanics: Point Particles and Relativity. Springer. ISBN 978-0-387-95586-5.
- W. Greiner (2010). Classical Mechanics: Systems of Particles and Hamiltonian Dynamics (2nd ed.). Springer. ISBN 978-3-642-03433-6.
- W. Greiner; D.A. Bromley (1998). Classical Electrodynamics. Springer. ISBN 978-0-387-94799-0.
- W. Greiner; L. Neise; H. Stöcker (2001). Thermodynamics and Statistical Mechanics. Springer. ISBN 978-0-387-94299-5.

Theoretical physics series

- W. Greiner; D.A. Bromley (2000). Quantum Mechanics: An introduction (4th ed.). Springer. ISBN 978-3-540-67458-0.
- W. Greiner (2001). Quantum Mechanics: Special chapters. Springer. ISBN 978-3-540-60073-2.
- W. Greiner; B. Müller; D.A. Bromley (2001). Quantum Mechanics: Symmetries (2nd ed.). Springer. ISBN 978-3-540-58080-5.
- W. Greiner; D. A. Bromley (2000). Relativistic Quantum Mechanics (3rd ed.). Springer. ISBN 978-3-540-67457-3.
- W. Greiner; J. Reinhardt (1996). Field Quantization. Springer. ISBN 978-3-540-59179-5.
- W. Greiner; J. Reinhardt (2008). Quantum Electrodynamics (4th ed.). Springer. ISBN 978-3-540-87560-4.
- W. Greiner; S. Schramm; E. Stein; D.A. Bromley (2006). Quantum Chromodynamics (3rd ed.). Springer. ISBN 978-3-540-48534-6.
- W. Greiner; B. Müller (2009). Gauge Theory of Weak Interactions. Springer. ISBN 978-3-540-87842-1.
- W. Greiner; J. Maruhn; D.A. Bromley (1996). Nuclear Models. Springer. ISBN 978-3-540-59180-1.
