= Cora Baldock =

Dutch-Australian sociologist

Cora Vellekoop Baldock (born 16 December 1935) is an Australian-Dutch Sociologist. She was president of the Australian Sociological Association 1979-1980 and served as a member of the Australian Federal Government's Multicultural Advisory Committee. She was the first female professor at Murdoch University, Perth, and its first professor of sociology.

== Biography ==
Cora Baldock was born Corrie Vellekoop on 16 December 1935 in Rotterdam, the Netherlands.

She grew up with relatives who worked in academia, which influenced her decision to study sociology at Leiden University, from which she graduated cum laude in 1960. Her master's thesis was on stratification in women's occupations. As an undergraduate, she was a mentor to Princess, later Queen, Beatrix of the Netherlands.

She obtained her PhD entitled Social stratification in New Zealand: vocational choices, achievement values and occupational stratification from the University of Canterbury in Christchurch, New Zealand.

Baldock married in 1970, and has two children.

== Career ==
Following her PhD, Baldock remained in New Zealand, teaching at the University of Canterbury in Christchurch. She was a senior lecturer at Australian National University before becoming Murdoch University's first female professor and first professor of sociology. She worked at ANU for 22 years. She was president of the Australian Sociological Association from 1979 to 1980, and founded the association's Jean Martin award committee.

Baldock was a member of the Federal Government's Multicultural Advisory Committee in the 1990s.

Her research interests are in the sociology of work, women's studies, and the intersection of gender and social policy. She has highlighted and redressed in her work the lack of differentiation by sex in sociological analyses of class stratification. Her study Volunteers in Welfare (1990) was an influential analysis of the resurgence of volunteering and the voluntary sector, and the tension between volunteering as a low-cost provision of social welfare and as a means of individual self-development for volunteers. In it, Baldock argues volunteer work represents the features of a capitalist state and the patriarchy, by fulfilling their economic and ideological functions and maintaining their status quo.

== Publications ==
- Baldassar, Loretta; Baldock, Cora Vellekoop and Wilding, Raelene, Families Caring Across Borders, Migration, Ageing and Transnational Caregiving, Palgrave Macmillan, Basingstoke, England, 2007.
- Baldock, Cora Vellekoop, 'Long-distance Migrants and Family Support', Health Sociology Review, vol. 12, no. 1, 2003, pp. 45–54.
- Baldock, Cora Vellekoop, Volunteers in Welfare, Allen & Unwin, Sydney, New South Wales, 1990.
- Baldock, Cora Vellekoop, Seniors as volunteers: an international perspective on policy, Ageing and Society, vol. 19, 1999, 581-602 pp.
- Baldock, Cora Vellekoop and Cass, Bettina, Women, Social Welfare and the State in Australia, 2nd edn, Allen & Unwin, Sydney, New South Wales, 1988.
- Baldock, Cora Vellekoop and Lally, Jim, Sociology in Australia and New Zealand: Theory and Methods, Greenwood Press, Westport, Connecticut, United States of America, 1974.
