= Bettina Cass =

Australian sociologist and social policy adviser

Bettina Cass AO FASSA
- Born: 1940 (age 85–86); Waverley, New South Wales, Australia
- Education: University of New South Wales

Bettina Cass AO FASSA (born 1940) is an Australian sociologist and social policy adviser. As of 2020, she is emeritus professor at both the University of New South Wales and the University of Sydney. After retirement, she continued to coordinate the Higher Research Degree programme at the Social Policy Research Centre, UNSW.

Bettina Cass was born in Waverley, New South Wales, Australia, in 1940.

Cass was elected Fellow of the Academy of the Social Sciences in Australia in 1989. She was appointed Officer of the Order of Australia in the 1990 Australia Day Honours for "service to social security policy and women's affairs".

Cass was married to Dr Cecil Cass, with whom she had four children. Her daughter, Gina Cass-Gottlieb, was appointed chair of the Australian Competition & Consumer Commission in March 2022.

== The Cass Review ==
The major contribution of Cass to policy was the Social Security Review, instigated by Social Security Minister Brian Howe, which she directed from 1986 to 1988. The Review was a model for many that came after it. It performed a wide ranging consultation and produced six background papers and a final report. The Review led to major changes in Australian social security programmes and operations, most of which have continued to the present. It made recommendations on family income support, sole parent family policy, unemployment policies, income support for illness and disability, and retirement incomes policy. Substantial revisions of programmes were undertaken by 1994, to which the review wholly or partially contributed.

Longer term effects of the Review included:

- linking of unemployment benefits to work assistance measures such as training and job placement assistance;
- guaranteed indexation of most payments to cost of living increases;
- ongoing monitoring and evaluation of programme outcomes, including a major evaluation every three to five years; and
- removal of gender-related eligibility for various payments.

The main changes to individual payments were:

- (1989) replacement of unemployment benefits with Jobsearch for under 17s, and Newstart for those unemployed for 12 months or more. and a far greater emphasis on work search efforts and requirements.

== Selected publications ==
- Cass, Bettina; Dawson, Madge; Temple, Diana; Willis, Sue; Winkler, Anne (1983), Why so few?: women academics in Australian universities, Sydney University Press, ISBN 978-0-424-00095-4
- Cass, Bettina (1983), Poverty and children: The effects of the recession 1974–1983, Social Welfare Research Centre, University of New South Wales
- Baldock, Cora V.; Cass, Bettina, eds. (1983), Women, social welfare and the State in Australia (Rev. ed.), Allen & Unwin, ISBN 978-0-86861-158-7
- Cass, Bettina; Social Security Review (Australia) (1988), Income support for the unemployed in Australia : towards a more active system, Australian Government Publishing Service, ISBN 978-0-644-05390-7
- Cass, Bettina; Cappo, David (1995), Social justice and the life course: Work, social participation and the distribution of income, Australian Catholic Social Welfare Commission
- Smyth, Paul; Cass, Bettina, eds. (1998), Contesting the Australian way: States, markets and civil society, Cambridge University Press, ISBN 978-0-521-63306-2
- Cass, Bettina; Couch, Rowanne (1998), Divided work divided society: Employment, unemployment and the distribution of income in 1990s Australia, University of Sydney, Research Institute for Humanities and Social Sciences, ISBN 978-0-9585973-0-2
