= Wolf Singer =

German neurophysiologist (born 1943)

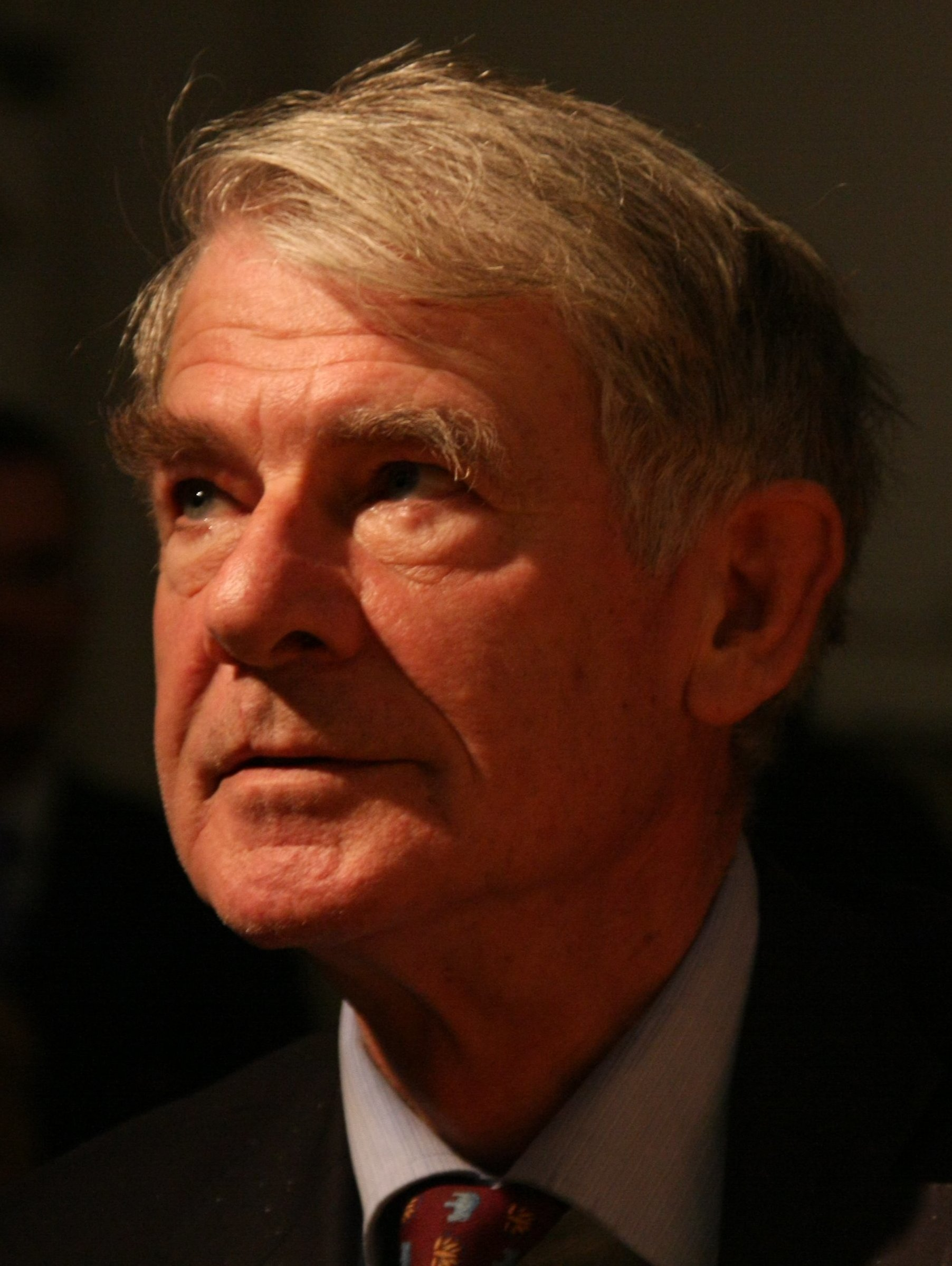
- Born: 9 March 1943; Munich, Germany
- Education: LMU Munich, Technical University of Munich
- Awards: Ernst Jung Prize (1994); Körber European Science Prize (2000)
- Scientific career
- Fields: Neuroscience, cognitive science, neurophysiology, neurobiology
- Workplaces: Max Planck Institute for Brain Research
- Thesis: The role of telencephalic commissures in bilateral EEG-synchrony (1968)
- Doctoral advisor: Otto Detlev Creutzfeldt

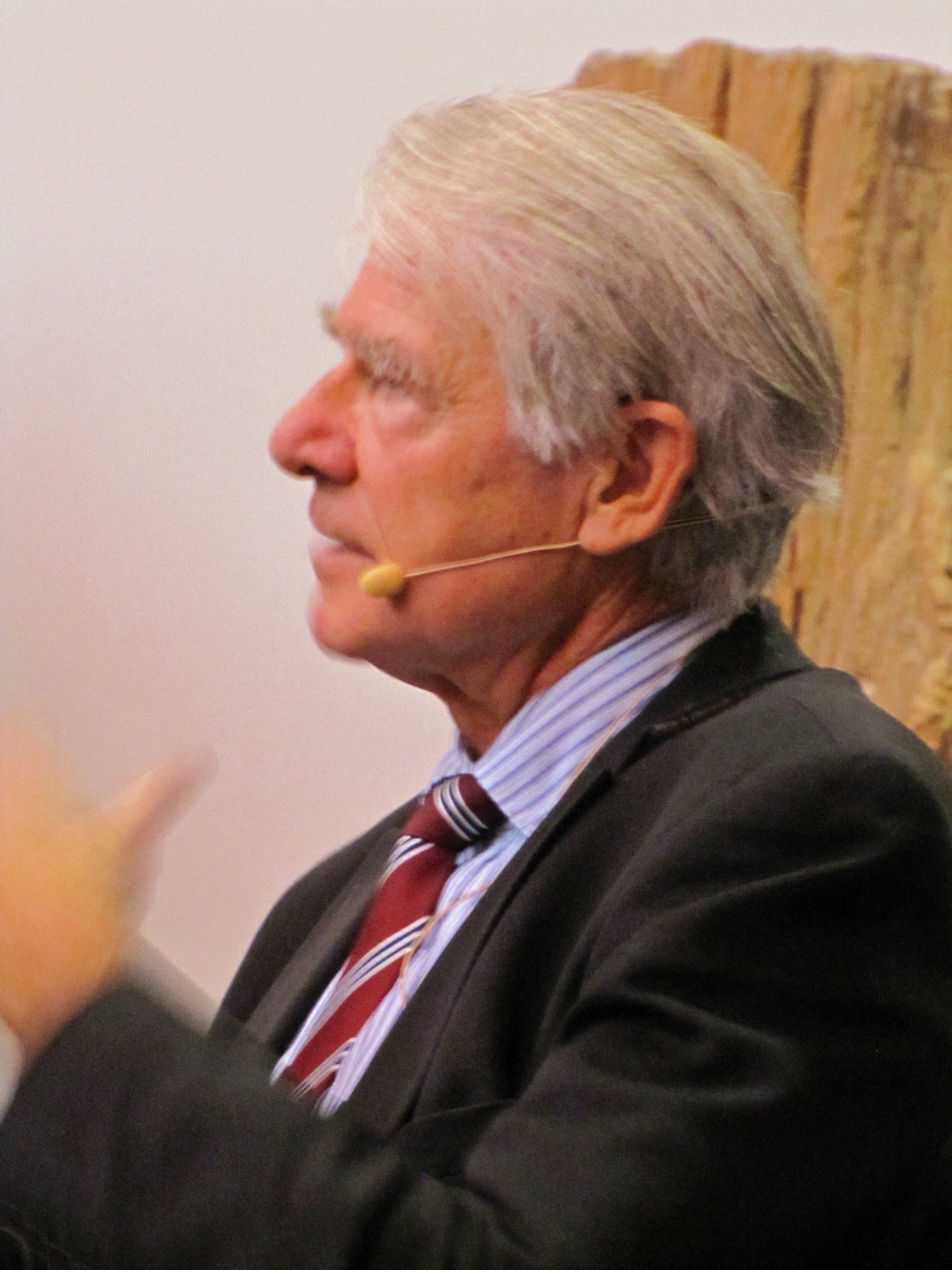
Singer (2012)

Wolf Joachim Singer (born 9 March 1943) is a German neurophysiologist.

== Life and career ==
Singer was born in Munich and studied medicine at LMU Munich from 1965 onwards (as a scholarship holder of the German Academic Scholarship Foundation) and 1965/66 two semesters at the Sorbonne in Paris. In 1968, he received his Ph.D. from LMU Munich with his doctoral thesis on "The role of telencephalic commissures in bilateral EEG-synchrony." His doctoral supervisor was Otto Detlev Creutzfeldt of the Max Planck Institute for Psychiatry. During his advanced training in neurophysiology, he spent a year at the University of Sussex in England. In 1970 he received his medical licence as a physician while working as a doctor at the LMU Klinikum.

In 1975, he habilitated in Physiology at the Medical Faculty of the Technical University of Munich. In 1981, he was appointed a member of the Max Planck Society and Director of the Department of Neurophysiology at the Max Planck Institute for Brain Research in Frankfurt am Main. Here, together with Walter Greiner and Horst Stöcker, he founded the Frankfurt Institute for Advanced Studies (FIAS) as well as the Brain Imaging Center (BIC) in 2004 and the Ernst Strüngmann Science Forum and the Ernst Strüngmann Institute (ESI). He is an honorary professor of physiology at the Goethe University Frankfurt. Since 2011 he has the status of an emeritus and as such continues to operate the "Singer-Emeritus-Department" at MPI Frankfurt.

Wolf Singer is the father of brain researcher and cognitive scientist Tania Singer.

== Work ==
The aim of the work of his neurophysiological department is to elucidate the neuronal processes in the case of so-called higher cognitive performance, such as in the case of visual perception, in memory, or in other ways of cognition. In his institute, among other things, the emergence of visual disorders amblyopia is also being studied.

In the neurophysiological research community, Singer is internationally known for his research and reflections on the physiological basis of attention and identification procedures. The institute, with its technically elaborate experiments, is primarily concerned with the binding problem, where the question is at the center of how different sensory aspects of an object – form, color, hardness, weight, smell, etc. - can be combined into a single object experience. The theory is based, among others, on the works by Christoph von der Malsburg. It attaches great importance to the temporal synchronicity of neuronal activity in the cortex. Corresponding oscillator frequencies of the nerve cells would then refer to the same object, while other frequencies would mark other objects.

Singer represents a naturalistic interpretation of neurophysiological data and strives to make the results of brain research known to the public.

Singer is a board member of the Mind & Life Institute.

He has also researched the neuroscience of meditation in partnership with Matthieu Ricard.

=== Free will and guilt ===
Singer, like Gerhard Roth, became the focus of public discussions in Germany through interviews, lectures and popular science essays regarding the consequences of neurological research to political and juridical, psychological and developmental psychology, pedagogical or anthropological, as well as architectural or urban questions and even to historical and philosophical views.

His thesis on the free will was particularly controversial. Singer declined to speak of a free will. This he expressed publicly in an article published in the Frankfurter Allgemeine Zeitung in 2004, whose subtitling he made in the slightly modified formulation "Brain structures determine us: We should stop talking about free will" as the main title of the reprinting of an extensive scientific contribution to the discussion "Brain as a Subject? (Part I)" in the German Journal of Philosophy. Singer argues that the natural scientific causal model, according to which the world is to be viewed as a closed deterministic whole, excludes freedom. Proponents of the concept of freedom as Peter Bieri argue, however, that the notion of freedom of will is only under certain conditions contrary to determinism and that these assumptions need not to be accepted.

Singer also demands that the lack of free will must have consequences for our conceptions of guilt and punishment: if no one can decide freely from a scientific point of view, it is not useful to make people responsible for their actions. Socially intolerable persons would have to be "locked away" and "subjected to specific educational programs".

In 2004, Wolf Singer was one of the authors of Das Manifest, a declaration of eleven leading neuroscientists on the presence and future of brain research, published in the magazine Gehirn & Geist.

== Honors and awards ==
Singer received many honors for his scientific work, including the Ernst Jung Prize for Science and Research, the Neuronal Plasticity Prize, the Zülch Prize, the Max Planck Prize for Public Relations, the Hessian Cultural Prize, the Communicator Prize of the Stifterverband für die Deutsche Wissenschaft, honorary doctorates of the Carl von Ossietzky University in Oldenburg and the Rutgers University, New Jersey, the Körber European Science Prize and the Medaille de la Ville de Paris. Since 1998 he has been a member of the German National Academy of Sciences Leopoldina and since 2003 of the German Academy for Language and Literature.

He was also honored in France becoming a knight of the National Order of the Legion of Honour (Chevalier of the Légion d'honneur). In 1992, Singer was appointed a lifelong member of the Pontifical Academy of Sciences in Rome. In 2002, he received the Ernst Hellmut Vits Award from the Westfälische Wilhelms-Universität in Münster (Westphalia).

Singer was a member of the Advisory Board of the Giordano Bruno Foundation until 2012. He is a member of the Board of Trustees of the Hertie Foundation. Since 2007 he has been a foreign member of the Russian Academy of Sciences. He is also a member of the Berlin-Brandenburg Academy of Sciences and Humanities and a fellow of the American Association for the Advancement of Science.

In 2011, he received the Officer's cross of the Order of Merit of the Federal Republic of Germany. In the same year Pope Benedict XVI appointed him as a member of the Pontifical Council for Culture. In 2013, the Leopoldina distinguished him with the Cothenius medal. In 2014, he was elected to the European Molecular Biology Organization.

== Publications ==
Selected articles

- Gray, Charles M.; König, Peter; Engel, Andreas K.; Singer, Wolf (1989). "Oscillatory responses in cat visual cortex exhibit inter-columnar synchronization which reflects global stimulus properties". Nature. 338 (6213). Springer Science and Business Media LLC: 334–337. Bibcode:1989Natur.338..334G. doi:10.1038/338334a0. ISSN 0028-0836. PMID 2922061. S2CID 4281744.
- Gray, C M; Singer, W (1989). "Stimulus-specific neuronal oscillations in orientation columns of cat visual cortex". Proceedings of the National Academy of Sciences. 86 (5): 1698–1702. Bibcode:1989PNAS...86.1698G. doi:10.1073/pnas.86.5.1698. ISSN 0027-8424. PMC 286768. PMID 2922407.
- Singer, W (1993). "Synchronization of Cortical Activity and its Putative Role in Information Processing and Learning". Annual Review of Physiology. 55 (1). Annual Reviews: 349–374. doi:10.1146/annurev.ph.55.030193.002025. ISSN 0066-4278. PMID 8466179.
- Visual feature integration and the temporal correlation hypothesis, Annual review of physiology, 1995.
- Neuronal synchrony: a versatile code for the definition of relations? Neuron (Elsevier), 1999.
- Engel, Andreas K.; Fries, Pascal; Singer, Wolf (2001). "Dynamic predictions: Oscillations and synchrony in top–down processing". Nature Reviews Neuroscience. 2 (10). Springer Science and Business Media LLC: 704–716. doi:10.1038/35094565. ISSN 1471-003X. PMID 11584308. S2CID 13224138.

Books

- Neurobiology of Human Values, Springer, 2005, ISBN 978-3-540-26253-4
- Dynamic coordination in the brain: from neurons to mind, MIT Press, 2010, ISBN 978-3-642-11667-4
- Interdisciplinary Anthropology: Continuing Evolution of Man, Springer, 2011, ISBN 978-0-262-01471-7
- Vom Gehirn zum Bewusstsein ("From brain to consciousness"), Suhrkamp, 2006.
- Hirnforschung und Meditation: Ein Dialog ("Brain research and meditation: a dialogue"), Unseld, 2008. With Matthieu Ricard.
- Der Beobachter im Gehirn: Essays zur Hirnforschung ("The observer in the brain – essays"), Suhrkamp, 2013.
- Beyond the Self: Conversations between Buddhism and Neuroscience, MIT Press, 2017. With Matthieu Ricard.
