= Ernst Strüngmann Institute der Max-Planck-Gesellschaft =

Independent research institute in Frankfurt am Main, Germany

- Formation: September 12, 2008
- Location: Frankfurt am Main
- Website: www.esi-frankfurt.de

The Ernst Strüngmann Institute der Max-Planck-Gesellscahft (ESI) is a research institute located in Frankfurt am Main, Hesse, Germany. The ESI is part of the Max Planck Society, an association of German research institutes. The institute's mission is to perform fundamental brain research.

== Development and History ==
In July 2008, a cooperation contract was signed between the Max Planck Society and pharmaceutical entrepreneurs Andreas and Thomas Strüngmann, founding the ESI as an independent brain research institute with the format of a Max Planck Institute. On 12 September 2008, the ESI was formally founded in the legal form of a nonprofit limited liability corporation (gGmbH). To finance the ESI, the Strüngmann brothers founded the Ernst Strüngmann Foundation (ESF).

ESI's founding directors are Wolf Singer and Pascal Fries, with Singer functioning as acting director until Fries became ESI's first director in July 2009. On 1 April 2011, when Prof. Singer assumed emeritus status at the Max Planck Institute for Brain Research, he joined the ESI as Senior Research Group leader.

In 2020, Wolf Singer became the managing director, until 2021, when David Poeppel became the managing director. On 1 January 2024, research director Pascal Fries left the institute. Late 2024 also David Poeppel left the institute. An emeritus Max Planck plant biologist, Lothar Willmitzer is currently at the institute as interim director.

== Research ==
Research at the ESI is organized in the following research groups, called labs and named after their respective heads:

- Brenner Lab (Discovering hidden patterns in the brain)
- Rademaker Lab (Mechanisms of human perceptual experiences)
- Havenith & Schölvinck Lab (Simultaneous encoding of cognitive processes during natural behaviour)
- Laurens Lab (Electrophysiology and modeling of navigation and vestibular systems)
- Schmidt Lab (Guest scientists; Mapping of the entorhinal-hippocampal neuronal network)
- Cuntz Lab (Guest scientists, Neural circuitry and brain morphology)

=== Former research groups ===
Throughout its history, the Ernst Strüngmann Institute (ESI) has hosted several additional research groups, that have significantly shaped the institute's scientific profile:

=== Fries Lab (Department) ===
2009–2023

The department led by Pascal Fries investigated the role of neuronal synchronization in cognitive processes. Based on the hypothesis that rhythmic neuronal activity enables functional communication between brain areas, the group studied the mechanisms and functional relevance of such synchronization.

=== Diester Lab ===
2011–2014

Ilka Diester's research group focused on the interaction between tactile perception, cognitive processing, and motor control. The aim was to better understand basic principles of brain function and to contribute to the development of neural prosthetics. The group used behavioral experiments, electrophysiology, and optogenetic tools.

=== Schmid Lab (Emmy Noether Group) ===
2012–2015

As part of the Emmy Noether Program, Michael C. Schmid’s group investigated the neuronal basis of visual perception. The main focus was on thalamo-cortical communication in attention, visibility, and following neural injury. The group combined electrophysiological recordings with methods such as fMRI, psychophysics, pharmacology, and optogenetics.

=== Vinck Lab ===
2016–2025

Martin Vinck's group combined experimental, computational, and theoretical approaches to investigate neural circuits, collective coding, and learning. The lab studied how different types of excitatory and inhibitory neurons shape cortical plasticity, how neural ensembles encode information via spatiotemporal patterns, and how predictive mechanisms support learning. The group used electrophysiology, optogenetics, machine learning, and information theory.

=== Poeppel Lab (Department) ===
2021–2024

Led by David Poeppel, this department focused on the neurobiological foundations of auditory cognition, including language, speech perception, and music. The group aimed to develop theoretically grounded and biologically realistic models for brain functions related to auditory processing. Methods included MEG, EEG, ECoG, and structural and functional MRI.

=== Singer Lab ===
2008–2026

The Singer Lab researched the neural basis of cognitive functions. The focus was on analyzing the functional organization of the cerebral cortex, with particular attention to the dynamics of neural interactions. The overarching hypothesis underlying all projects was that the brain uses not only the amplitude and spatial distribution of neural responses for its computations, but also their temporal relationships.

== Controversy Over Abuse of Power and Sexual Misconduct ==
The Max Planck Society and the Ernst Strüngmann Institute (ESI) have come under media scrutiny. The ESI, founded by pharmaceutical billionaires Andreas and Thomas Strüngmann, faces allegations of abuse of power, bullying, and sexual misconduct. Several employees of the institute have reported inappropriate behavior, some of which is said to have originated from senior management. Despite internal investigations, no significant consequences were imposed on the accused. The Max Planck Society emphasizes that it takes the allegations seriously but asserts that it is not responsible for the ESI.
