= Marc Rafelski =

American astrophysicist

Marc Alexander Rafelski
- Born: February 8, 1982 (age 44); Frankfurt, Germany
- Education: University of California, San Diego
- Spouse: Lauren Anne Elmegreen Rafelski
- Scientific career
- Fields: Astrophysics
- Workplaces: Space Telescope Science Institute
- Thesis: Star formation in damped Lyman-alpha systems and the outskirts of Lyman break galaxies (2011)
- Doctoral advisor: Arthur M. Wolfe

Marc Alexander Rafelski is an American astrophysicist. Rafelski studied astronomy at the University of California, Los Angeles with Andrea Ghez. He obtained his PhD in physics from the University of California, San Diego, under supervision of Arthur Wolfe, in 2011.

== Career ==
Between 2011 and 2016 Rafelski held postdoc positions at IPAC, Caltech, and NASA Goddard, moving on to a staff position at the Space Telescope Science Institute in Baltimore in 2016. Starting in 2020, he is the branch manager for the Cosmic Origins Spectrograph (COS), a science instrument that was installed on the Hubble Space Telescope during Servicing Mission 4 (STS-125) in May 2009.

Rafelski studies the formation and evolution of galaxies by looking at the physical characteristics and processes of high redshift galaxies and their associated gas reservoirs, inflows, and outflows. He started publishing already as an undergraduate student, both in astronomy and heavy-ion physics. Since then he has co-authored more than 200 scientific papers.

== Personal life ==
Marc Rafelski is son of Johann and Helga Rafelski, and adoptive son of Victoria Grossack. He is married to Lauren Anne Elmegreen Rafelski. The couple has two children and lives in Maryland.
