= Susanne Rafelski =

American biochemist

Susanne Marie Rafelski
- Born: March 17, 1980 (age 46); Frankfurt, Germany
- Education: Stanford University
- Scientific career
- Fields: Quantitative biology
- Workplaces: Allen Institute for Cell Science
- Thesis: Integrating bacterial polarity with host-cytoskeletal dynamics: initiation of listeria monocytogenes actin-based motility (2005)
- Doctoral advisor: Julie Theriot

Susanne Marie Rafelski is an American biochemist. Rafelski studied biochemistry at the University of Arizona with David Galbraith. She obtained her PhD in 2005 from Stanford University, under supervision of Julie Theriot.

== Career ==
Rafelski continued her research holding postdoc positions at Center for Cell Dynamics, University of Washington and at the University of California, San Francisco. In 2011 she became Assistant Professor at the University of California, Irvine. As of 2016 Rafelski is a senior scientist at the Allen Institute for Cell Science in Seattle, and since 2020 she is Deputy Director for the Cell Science scientific programs.

At the Allen Institute, Rafelski is leading a team using a deep-learning algorithm on unlabelled cells showing DNA and substructures in the nucleus, plus cell membranes and mitochondria.

== Personal life ==
Susanne Rafelski is daughter of Johann and Helga Rafelski and adoptive daughter of Victoria Grossack. She lives in Seattle, WA.
