= Horst Stöcker =

German theoretical physicist

- Born: 1952 (age 73–74); Frankfurt, West Germany
- Education: Goethe University Frankfurt (PhD)
- Scientific career
- Fields: Theoretical physics
- Workplaces: Goethe University Frankfurt
- Thesis: Shock waves in nuclear matter – proof by circumstantial evidence (1979)
- Doctoral advisor: Walter Greiner
- Doctoral students: Sabine Hossenfelder

Horst Stöcker (born 1952) is a German theoretical physicist and Judah M. Eisenberg Professor Laureatus at the Goethe University Frankfurt working in nuclear physics and astrophysics.

== Education and career ==
After Abitur 1971, Stöcker studied physics, chemistry, mathematics and philosophy at the Goethe University Frankfurt, where he got his Dr. phil.nat. in 1979 under Walter Greiner. The title of the dissertation was Shock waves in nuclear matter – proof by circumstantial evidence.

He went on to GSI Helmholtz Centre for Heavy Ion Research and – as a DAAD – postdoctoral fellow – to Lawrence Berkeley National Laboratory, UC Berkeley.

Stöcker joined the faculty of physics and astronomy at Michigan State University and the National Superconducting Cyclotron Laboratory, NSCL, in 1982.

In 1985, Stöcker moved on to a professorship for Theoretical Physics and Astrophysics at Goethe University Frankfurt, where Stöcker holds the Judah M. Eisenberg endowed chair since 2004.

From 2000 to 2003, Stöcker was twice elected vice president at Goethe University, for science, mathematics, computer science, IT and high performance computing, HPC, for the medical school and for the Universitätsklinikum Frankfurt, the hospital of the Goethe University. He was re-elected ViP for a third time 2006–2007.

Stöcker is senior fellow, and, with Walter Greiner and Wolf Singer, founding director and chair of the executive board at the international interdisciplinary Frankfurt Institute for Advanced Studies (FIAS) – a public-private scientific foundation for theoretical research in fundamental science, natural science and computational life science, of Goethe University.

Horst Stöcker was the scientific chairman and CEO (director general) at the Darmstadt GSI Helmholtz Centre for Heavy Ion Research, 2007–2015.

In 2008 Stöcker was elected vice-president of Helmholtz Gemeinschaft Deutscher Forschungszentren HGF for the Research Area "Struktur der Materie", 2008, and was reelected 2010–2012.

== Honors ==
- Judah Moshe Eisenberg Professor Laureatus für Theoretische Physik, at Goethe University Frankfurt
- Doctor honoris causa of the Russian Academy of Sciences, RAS, Moscow, Russia
- Doctor honoris causa of the Joint Institute for Nuclear Research, Dubna, Russia
- Doktor honoris causa of the University of Bucharest, Romania
- Fellow of the European Physical Society, EPS, London, Great Britain
- Fellow of the Institute of Physics, IoP, London, Great Britain
- Member, Deutsche Akademie der Technikwissenschaften, acatech, Munich
- Member, Academia Europaea, London, Great Britain
- Hessian Order of Merit

Stöcker published around 500 publications that were cited around 50,000 times, supervised around 50 doctoral students, and submitted 5 patents.

== Publications ==
- Walter Greiner, Ludwig Neise, Horst Stöcker: Thermodynamik und Statistische Mechanik. Harri Deutsch, Thun und Frankfurt am Main 1993, ISBN 3-8171-1262-9
- Horst Stöcker: Mathematische Formeln für die technische Ausbildung und Praxis, Deutsch (Harri) 1995, ISBN 3-8171-1440-0
- Horst Stöcker: Mathematik – Physik – Chemie, Das Basiswissen, 3 Bde., Deutsch (Harri) 2000, ISBN 3-8171-1633-0
- Horst Stöcker: Taschenbuch mathematischer Formeln und moderner Verfahren, Deutsch (Harri) 2003, ISBN 3-8171-1701-9
- Horst Stöcker: Taschenbuch der Physik, Deutsch (Harri) 2004, ISBN 3-8171-1720-5
