= Tatjana Tchumatchenko =

German physicist (born 1980)

Tatjana Tchumatchenko (born 1980) is a German physicist in the field of theoretical neuroscience. She is a professor of physiological chemistry at the University of Mainz and a research group leader at the University Hospital of Bonn, Germany. In her research she investigates how neural networks compute and how particular activity patterns emerge from synaptic and neuronal features.

== Education and early research ==
In 2006, Tchumatchenko obtained her diploma in physics at the Technical University of Darmstadt (Germany). In 2010, she completed the Graduate Program “Theoretical and Computational Neuroscience” at the Göttingen Graduate Center for Neurosciences, Biophysics, and Molecular Biosciences at Göttingen University (Germany), and received the degree of Dr. rer. nat in physics. In 2011, she was a Postdoctoral Fellow with a joint appointment at the Max Planck Institute for Dynamics and Self-Organization and the Bernstein Center for Computational Neuroscience Göttingen. From 2011 to 2013, Tatjana Tchumatchenko was a Postdoctoral Fellow at the Center for Theoretical Neuroscience at Columbia University in the City of New York, USA, funded by the Volkswagen Foundation.

== Career ==
In 2013, Tchumatchenko became an Independent Research Group Leader at the Max Planck Institute for Brain Research (Germany). Starting in November 2020, she served as a professor of computational neuroscience of behavior at the University of Bonn’s School of Medicine. Since October 2021, she has been a professor and deputy director at the Institute of Physiological Chemistry at the University Medical Center of the University of Mainz, as well as a research group leader at the University Hospital of Bonn.

Her group „Theory of neural dynamics” focuses on the computational modelling and mathematical analysis of single neurons, neuronal populations, and recurrent networks. The Tchumatchenko group employs mathematical tools and computer simulations to investigate how single neurons and populations respond to their synaptic inputs, and how they interact to give rise to functioning neuronal circuits.

== Selected memberships ==
- Bernstein Network for Computational Neuroscience
- International Max Planck Research School (IMPRS) for Neural Circuits
- German-Ukrainian Academic Society

== Selected Awards and Honours ==
- 2020: Member of the Young Academy of Europe
- 2020: ERC Starting Grant of the European Research Council
- 2018: Selected by the Focus magazine as one of 25 young innovators who will shape Germany in the next 25 years
- 2016 & 2017: Dollwet Foundation Award
- 2016: Heinz Maier-Leibnitz-Prize of the German Research Foundation (DFG)
- 2011 – 2013: Computational Sciences fellowship by the Volkswagen Foundation
- 2004 – 2006: Fellow of the German National Merit Foundation
- 2001: Award of the Membership in the German Physical Society
