= Ladan Shams =

American psychologist

Academic background
- Education: University of Southern California (MS, PhD), California State University, Northridge (BS)
- Thesis: Development of Visual Shape Primitives (1999)
- Doctoral advisor: Christoph von der Malsburg

Academic work
- Discipline: psychology
- Sub-discipline: cognitive psychology
- Institutions: UCLA
- Main interests: multisensory perception, cognitive neuroscience

Ladan Shams is an American psychologist and professor of psychology, BioEngineering, and Neuroscience at the University of California, Los Angeles. She is known for her works on multisensory perception and cognitive neuroscience. She is an associate editor of the journals Frontiers in Integrative Neuroscience, Multisensory Research, Psychonomic Bulletin & Review, and Frontiers in Human Neuroscience.
