= McGurk effect =

Perceptual illusion

Two different video clips with the same repeated [ba ba] audio. People affected by the McGurk effect perceive the second clip as sounding more like [ga ga].

The McGurk effect is a perceptual phenomenon that demonstrates an interaction between hearing and vision in speech perception. The illusion occurs when the auditory component of one sound is paired with the visual component of another sound, leading to the perception of a third sound. The visual information a person gets from seeing a person speak changes the way they hear the sound. If a person is getting poor-quality auditory information but good-quality visual information, they may be more likely to experience the McGurk effect.

Integration abilities for audio and visual information may also influence whether a person will experience the effect. People who are better at sensory integration have been shown to be more susceptible to the effect. Many people are affected differently by the McGurk effect based on many factors, including brain damage and other disorders.

== Background ==
It was first described in 1976 in a paper by Harry McGurk and John MacDonald, titled "Hearing Lips and Seeing Voices" in Nature (23 December 1976). This effect was discovered by accident when McGurk and his research assistant, MacDonald, asked a technician to dub a video with a different phoneme from the one spoken while conducting a study on how infants perceive language at different developmental stages. When the video was played back, both researchers heard a third phoneme rather than the one spoken or mouthed in the video.

This effect may be experienced when a video of one phoneme's production is dubbed with a sound-recording of a different phoneme being spoken. Often, the perceived phoneme is a third, intermediate phoneme. As an example, the syllables /ba-ba/ are spoken over the lip movements of /ga-ga/, and the perception is of /da-da/. McGurk and MacDonald originally believed that this resulted from the common phonetic and visual properties of /b/ and /g/. Two types of illusion in response to incongruent audiovisual stimuli have been observed: fusions ('ba' auditory and 'ga' visual produce 'da') and combinations ('ga' auditory and 'ba' visual produce 'bga'). This is the brain's effort to provide the consciousness with its best guess about the incoming information. The information coming from the eyes and ears is contradictory, and in this instance, the eyes (visual information) have had a greater effect on the brain, and thus the fusion and combination responses have been created.

Vision is the primary sense for humans, but speech perception is multimodal, which means that it involves information from more than one sensory modality, in particular, audition and vision. The McGurk effect arises during phonetic processing because the integration of audio and visual information happens early in speech perception. The McGurk effect is very robust; that is, knowledge about it seems to have little effect on one's perception of it. This is different from certain optical illusions, which break down once one "sees through" them. Some people, including those that have been researching the phenomenon for more than twenty years, experience the effect even when they are aware that it is taking place. With the exception of people who can identify most of what is being said from lip reading alone, most people are quite limited in their ability to identify speech from visual-only signals. A more extensive phenomenon is the ability of visual speech to increase the intelligibility of heard speech in a noisy environment. Visible speech can also alter the perception of perfectly audible speech sounds when the visual speech stimuli are mismatched with the auditory speech. Normally, speech perception is thought to be an auditory process; however, our use of information is immediate, automatic, and, to a large degree, unconscious and therefore, despite what is widely accepted as true, speech is not only something we hear. Speech is perceived by all of the senses working together (seeing, touching, and listening to a face move). The brain is often unaware of the separate sensory contributions of what it perceives. Therefore, when it comes to recognizing speech the brain cannot differentiate whether it is seeing or hearing the incoming information.

It has also been examined in relation to witness testimony. Wareham and Wright's 2005 study showed that inconsistent visual information can change the perception of spoken utterances, suggesting that the McGurk effect may have many influences in everyday perception. Not limited to syllables, the effect can occur in whole words and have an effect on daily interactions that people are unaware of. Research into this area can provide information on not only theoretical questions, but also it can provide therapeutic and diagnostic relevance for those with disorders relating to audio and visual integration of speech cues.

== Factors ==
=== Internal ===
==== Brain damage ====
Both hemispheres of the brain make a contribution to the McGurk effect. They work together to integrate speech information that is received through the auditory and visual senses. A McGurk response is more likely to occur in right-handed individuals for whom the face has privileged access to the right hemisphere and words to the left hemisphere. In people that have had callosotomies done, the McGurk effect is still present but significantly slower. In people with lesions to the left hemisphere of the brain, visual features often play a critical role in speech and language therapy. People with lesions in the left hemisphere of the brain show a greater McGurk effect than normal controls. Visual information strongly influences speech perception in these people. There is a lack of susceptibility to the McGurk illusion if left hemisphere damage resulted in a deficit to visual segmental speech perception. In people with right hemisphere damage, impairment on both visual-only and audio-visual integration tasks is exhibited, although they are still able to integrate the information to produce a McGurk effect. Integration only appears if visual stimuli is used to improve performance when the auditory signal is impoverished but audible. Therefore, there is a McGurk effect exhibited in people with damage to the right hemisphere of the brain but the effect is not as strong as a normal group.

==== Dyslexia ====
People with dyslexia exhibit a smaller McGurk effect than normal readers of the same chronological age, but they showed the same effect as reading-level age-matched readers. People with dyslexia particularly differed for combination responses, not fusion responses. The smaller McGurk effect may be due to the difficulties dyslexics have in perceiving and producing consonant clusters.

==== Specific language impairment ====
Children with specific language impairment show a significantly lower McGurk effect than the average child. They use less visual information in speech perception, or have a reduced attention to articulatory gestures, but have no trouble perceiving auditory-only cues.

==== Autism spectrum disorders ====
Children with autism spectrum disorders (ASD) showed a significantly reduced McGurk effect than children without. However, if the stimulus was nonhuman (for example bouncing a tennis ball to the sound of a bouncing beach ball) then they scored similarly to children without ASD. Younger children with ASD show a very reduced McGurk effect; however, this diminishes with age. As the individuals grow up, the effect they show becomes closer to those who did not have ASD. It has been suggested that the weakened McGurk effect seen in people with ASD is due to deficits in identifying both the auditory and visual components of speech rather than in the integration of said components (although distinguishing speech components as speech components may be isomorphic to integrating them).

==== Language-learning disabilities ====
Adults with language-learning disabilities exhibit a much smaller McGurk effect than other adults. These people are not as influenced by visual input as most people. Therefore, people with poor language skills will produce a smaller McGurk effect. A reason for the smaller effect in this population is that there may be uncoupled activity between anterior and posterior regions of the brain, or left and right hemispheres. Cerebellar or basal ganglia etiology is also possible.

==== Alzheimer’s disease ====
In patients with Alzheimer's disease (AD), there is a smaller McGurk effect exhibited than in those without. Often a reduced size of the corpus callosum produces a hemisphere disconnection process. Less influence on visual stimulus is seen in patients with AD, which is a reason for the lowered McGurk effect.

==== Schizophrenia ====
The McGurk effect is not as pronounced in schizophrenic individuals as in non-schizophrenic individuals. However, it is not significantly different in adults. Schizophrenia slows down the development of audiovisual integration and does not allow it to reach its developmental peak. However, no degradation is observed. Schizophrenics are more likely to rely on auditory cues than visual cues in speech perception.

==== Aphasia ====
People with aphasia show impaired perception of speech in all conditions (visual-only, auditory-only, and audio-visual), and therefore exhibited a small McGurk effect. The greatest difficulty for aphasics is in the visual-only condition showing that they use more auditory stimuli in speech perception.

==== Bipolar disorder ====
A small study (N=22 per group) showed no apparent difference between individuals with bipolar disorder and those without, with respect to the McGurk effect. However, people with bipolar disorder showed significantly lower scores on a lipreading task. This may suggest that the neural pathways formed and activated in the integration of auditory and visual speech information in individuals with bipolar disorder are different compared to those in people without any mental disorder.

=== External ===
==== Cross-dubbing ====
Discrepancy in vowel category significantly reduced the magnitude of the McGurk effect for fusion responses. Auditory /a/ tokens dubbed onto visual /i/ articulations were more compatible than the reverse. This could be because /a/ has a wide range of articulatory configurations whereas /i/ is more limited, which makes it much easier for subjects to detect discrepancies in the stimuli. /i/ vowel contexts produce the strongest effect, while /a/ produces a moderate effect, and /u/ has almost no effect.

==== Mouth visibility ====
The McGurk effect is stronger when the right side of the speaker's mouth (on the viewer's left) is visible. People tend to get more visual information from the right side of a speaker's mouth than the left or even the whole mouth. This relates to the hemispheric attention factors discussed in the brain hemispheres section above.

==== Visual distractors ====
The McGurk effect is weaker when there is a visual distractor present that the listener is attending to. Visual attention modulates audiovisual speech perception. Another form of distraction is movement of the speaker. A stronger McGurk effect is elicited if the speaker's face/head is motionless, rather than moving.

==== Syllable structure ====
A strong McGurk effect can be seen for click-vowel syllables compared to weak effects for isolated clicks. This shows that the McGurk effect can happen in a non-speech environment. Phonological significance is not a necessary condition for a McGurk effect to occur; however, it does increase the strength of the effect.

==== Gender ====
Females show a stronger McGurk effect than males. Women show significantly greater visual influence on auditory speech than men did for brief visual stimuli, but no difference is apparent for full stimuli. Another aspect regarding gender is the issue of male faces and voices as stimuli in comparison to female faces and voices as stimuli. Although, there is no difference in the strength of the McGurk effect for either situation. If a male face is dubbed with a female voice, or vice versa, there is still no difference in strength of the McGurk effect. Knowing that the voice you hear is different from the face you see – even if different genders – doesn't eliminate the McGurk effect.

==== Familiarity ====
Subjects who are familiar with the faces of the speakers are less susceptible to the McGurk effect than those who are unfamiliar with the faces of the speakers. On the other hand, there was no difference regarding voice familiarity.

==== Expectation ====
Semantic congruency had a significant impact on the McGurk illusion. The effect is experienced more often and rated as clearer in the semantically congruent condition relative to the incongruent condition. When a person was expecting a certain visual or auditory appearance based on the semantic information leading up to it, the McGurk effect was greatly increased.

==== Self-influence ====
The McGurk effect can be observed when the listener is also the speaker or articulator. While looking at oneself in the mirror and articulating visual stimuli while listening to another auditory stimulus, a strong McGurk effect can be observed. In the other condition, where the listener speaks auditory stimuli softly while watching another person articulate the conflicting visual gestures, a McGurk effect can still be seen, although it is weaker.

==== Temporal synchrony ====
Temporal synchrony is not necessary for the McGurk effect to be present. Subjects are still strongly influenced by auditory stimuli even when it lagged the visual stimuli by 180 milliseconds (point at which McGurk effect begins to weaken). There was less tolerance for the lack of synchrony if the auditory stimuli preceded the visual stimuli. In order to produce a significant weakening of the McGurk effect, the auditory stimuli had to precede the visual stimuli by 60 milliseconds, or lag by 240 milliseconds.

==== Physical task diversion ====
The McGurk effect was greatly reduced when attention was diverted to a tactile task (touching something). Touch is a sensory perception like vision and audition, therefore increasing attention to touch, decreases the attention to auditory and visual senses.

==== Gaze ====
The eyes do not need to fixate in order to integrate audio and visual information in speech perception. There was no difference in the McGurk effect when the listener was focusing anywhere on the speaker's face. The effect does not appear if the listener focuses beyond the speaker's face. In order for the McGurk effect to become insignificant, the listener's gaze must deviate from the speaker's mouth by at least 60 degrees.

== Other languages ==
Whatever the language, all listeners rely on visual information to a degree in speech perception. But the McGurk effect's intensity differs across languages. Dutch, English, Spanish, German, Italian and Turkish language listeners experience a robust McGurk effect; Japanese and Chinese listeners, weaker. Most research on the McGurk effect between languages has been between English and Japanese. A smaller McGurk effect occurs in Japanese listeners than English listeners. The cultural practice of face avoidance in Japanese people may diminish the McGurk effect, as well as tone and syllabic structures of the language. This could also be why Chinese listeners are less susceptible to visual cues, and similar to Japanese, produce a smaller effect than English listeners. Studies also show that Japanese listeners do not show a developmental increase in visual influence after six, as English children do. Japanese listeners identify incompatibility between visual and auditory stimuli better than English listeners. This greater ability could relate to Japanese's lacking consonant clusters. Regardless, listeners of all languages resort to visual stimuli when speech is unintelligible; the McGurk effect then applies to them equally. The McGurk effect works with listeners of every tested language.

== Hearing impairment ==
Experiments have been conducted involving hard-of-hearing individuals and individuals who have had cochlear implants. These individuals tend to weigh visual information from speech more heavily than auditory information. In comparison to normal-hearing individuals, this is not different unless there is more than one syllable, such as a word. Regarding the McGurk experiment, responses from cochlear-implanted users produced the same responses as normal-hearing individuals when an auditory bilabial stimulus is dubbed onto a visual velar stimulus. However, when an auditory dental stimulus is dubbed onto a visual bilabial stimulus, the responses are quite different. The McGurk effect is still present in individuals with impaired hearing or using cochlear implants, although it is quite different in some aspects.

== Infants ==
By measuring an infant's attention to certain audiovisual stimuli, a response that is consistent with the McGurk effect can be recorded. From just minutes to a couple of days old, infants can imitate adult facial movements, and within weeks of birth, infants can recognize lip movements and speech sounds. At this point, the integration of audio and visual information can happen, but not at a proficient level. The first evidence of the McGurk effect can be seen at four months of age; however, more evidence is found for 5-month-olds. Through the process of habituating an infant to a certain stimulus and then changing the stimulus (or part of it, such as ba-voiced/va-visual to da-voiced/va-visual), a response that simulates the McGurk effect becomes apparent. The strength of the McGurk effect displays a developmental pattern that increases throughout childhood and extends into adulthood.

== See also ==
- Duplex perception
- Ideasthesia
- Lip reading
- Motor theory of speech perception
- Multisensory integration
- Speech perception
- Viseme
- Yanny or Laurel

== Bibliography ==
- McGurk, H.; MacDonald, J. (1976). "Hearing lips and seeing voices". Nature. 264 (5588): 746–748. Bibcode:1976Natur.264..746M. doi:10.1038/264746a0. PMID 1012311. S2CID 4171157.
- Wright, Daniel; Wareham, Gary (2005). "Mixing sound and vision: The interaction of auditory and visual information for earwitnesses of a crime scene". Legal and Criminological Psychology. 10 (1): 103–108. doi:10.1348/135532504x15240. S2CID 18781846.
