= Christoph von der Malsburg =

German physicist and neuroscientist

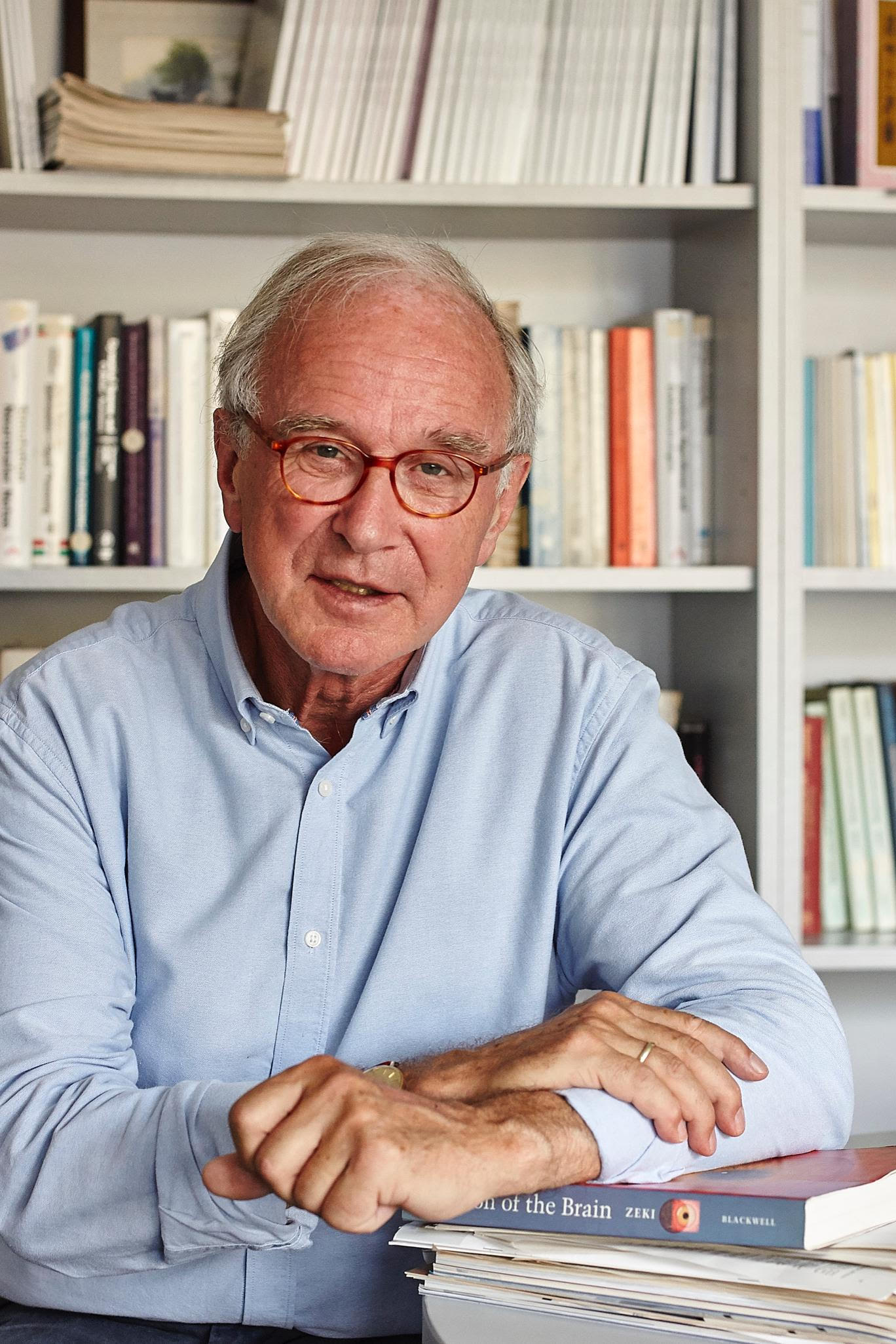
- Christoph von der Malsburg
- Born: 8 May 1942 (age 84); Kassel, Hesse-Nassau
- Education: University of Heidelberg
- Scientific career
- Fields: Neuroscientist
- Workplaces: University of Southern California
- Thesis: Bestimmung der π^{−}-Masse (1970)
- Doctoral students: Ladan Shams

Christoph von der Malsburg (born 8 May 1942) is a German physicist and neuroscientist.

== Early life ==
von der Malsburg obtained his PhD with a concentration in elementary particle physics at CERN and the University of Heidelberg in 1970.

== Career ==
He joined the neurobiology department of the Max-Planck-Institute for Biophysical Chemistry in Göttingen. He remained there until 1987, when he became a professor of Computer Science, Neuroscience, Physics and Psychology at the University of Southern California in Los Angeles. In 1990, he founded the Institut für Neuroinformatik (Institute for Neural Computation) at Ruhr-University Bochum, together with Werner von Seelen. He commuted between the two institutions until 2007, when he joined the Frankfurt Institute for Advanced Studies as a Senior Fellow.

Von der Malsburg co-founded two companies and received a number of awards. He is a member of the scientific advisory board of the Human Brain Project and one of the members of the founding board of Mindfire Foundation, of which he also heads the neuroscience board.

== Brain Theory ==
His research interests focused on processes of organization in the brain with emphasis on the structure and function of the visual system. His publications concerning the theory of self-organization of regular fiber projections in the visual system made him a pioneer of this field. He is known for his criticism of the theory of neural networks. He claimed that the generally accepted view fails because of the binding problem. To solve it he formulated the Dynamic Link Architecture, a system of rapidly switching network fragments, as applied to facial recognition.

== Recognition ==
- Pioneer Award 1994 of the Neural Network Council of the IEEE
- Karl Heinz Beckurts Foundation Award 1998
- Koerber-Award for European Science 2000
- Hebb Award 2003 of the International Neural Network Society
- President of the European Neural Network Society from 1995 to 1996
- Fellow of the International Neural Network Society
- Co-editor of several journals
