= Bjorn Merker =

Swedish neuroscientist (born 1943)

Bjorn Merker (also: Björn Merker), Swedish citizen born May 15, 1943, in Tetschen (now Czech Republic), is a neuroscientist and an independent interdisciplinary scholar educated in the USA, now living in southern Sweden.

Merker studied psychology and brain science in the U.S., receiving a B.A. in psychology at Queens College of the City University of New York (1975), and a PhD in psychology and brain science at the Massachusetts Institute of Technology in 1980 for work on midbrain orienting mechanisms. He then worked on oculomotor physiology in cats at UCLA and on the primary visual cortex of macaques at New York University. An interest in comparative behavioral biology led him to study song development and mirror self-recognition in gibbons, and eventually to research on the biological roots and evolutionary background of human music and language. With Nils Wallin and Steven Brown he edited the interdisciplinary volume The Origins of Music. In retirement, he continues active work on theoretical topics that include the analysis of brain macrosystems and their interaction, countercurrent modelling of cortical memory, the subcortical foundations of brain mechanisms of attention and consciousness, and the biological background to human music and language. Merker's theory is featured at online websites, such as by McGill University.

== Entrepreneurship ==
Bjorn is the chief scientist at a Swedish deep-tech neuroscience company, Mother. AB, designing VR and biofeedback mental health tools.

== Authored ==
=== Books ===
- B. Merker (2012): From probabilities to percepts. A subcortical "global best estimate buffer" as locus of phenomenal experience". In: S. Edelman, T. Fekete and N. Zach (Eds.): Being in Time. Dynamical models of phenomenal experience. (pp. 37–79). Amsterdam. John Benjamins Publishing Company.
- B. Merker (in press): "The vocal learning constellation: imitation, ritual culture, encephalization." In: N. Bannan & S. Mithen (Eds.). Music, language and human evolution. Oxford: Oxford University Press.
- N.L. Wallin, B. Merker & S. Brown (Eds.)(2000): The origins of music. The M.I.T. Press, Cambridge, Mass.
- B. Merker (1980): "The Sentinel Hypothesis - A role for the mammalian superior colliculus." Doctoral Dissertation, Massachusetts Institute of Technology. Cambridge, Mass.

=== Selected articles ===
- B. Merker, K. Williford & D. Rudrauf (2021): "The Integrated Information Theory of consciousness: A case of mistaken identity". In: Behavioral and Brain Sciences, 1-72. doi:10.1017/S0140525X21000881
- B. Merker (2013): "Cortical gamma oscillations: the functional key is activation, not cognition". In: Neuroscience and Biobehavioral Reviews 37 (2013) 401–417
- B. Merker, G. Madison & P. Eckerdal (2009): "On the role and origin of isochrony in human rhythmic entrainment." In: Cortex 45: 4-17.
- B. Merker (2007): "Consciousness without a cerebral cortex: a challenge for neuroscience and medicine." Target article, commentaries and author's response. In: The Behavioral and Brain Sciences 30: 63-134
- B. Merker (2006): "The Conformal Motive in Birdsong, Music, and Language: An Introduction.", The Neurosciences and Music II: From Perception to Performance. In: Annals of the New York Academy of Sciences, Volume 1060, December 2005: 17-28.
- B. Merker (2004). "Cortex, countercurrent context, and dimensional integration of lifetime memory." Cortex, 40: 559-576. Preprint at: http://cogprints.org/6456/
- M. Ujhelyi, B. Merker, P. Buk & T. Geissmann (2000). "Observations on the behavior of gibbons in the presence of mirrors." Journal of Comparative Psychology, 114: 253-262.
- B. Merker & C. Cox (1999): "Development of the female great call in Hylobates gabriellae: A case study." Folia Primatologica, 70: 96-106.
- E. Schwartz & B. Merker (1986). "Computer aided neuroanatomy: Differential geometry of cortical surfaces and an optimal flattening algorithm." IEEE Computer Graphics and Applications, 6: 36-44.
- B. Merker & J. Schlag (1985): "Role of intralaminar thalamus in gaze mechanisms: Evidence from electrical stimulation and fiber sparing lesions in cats." In: Experimental Brain Research, 59: 388-394.
