= Berndt Müller =

German physicist

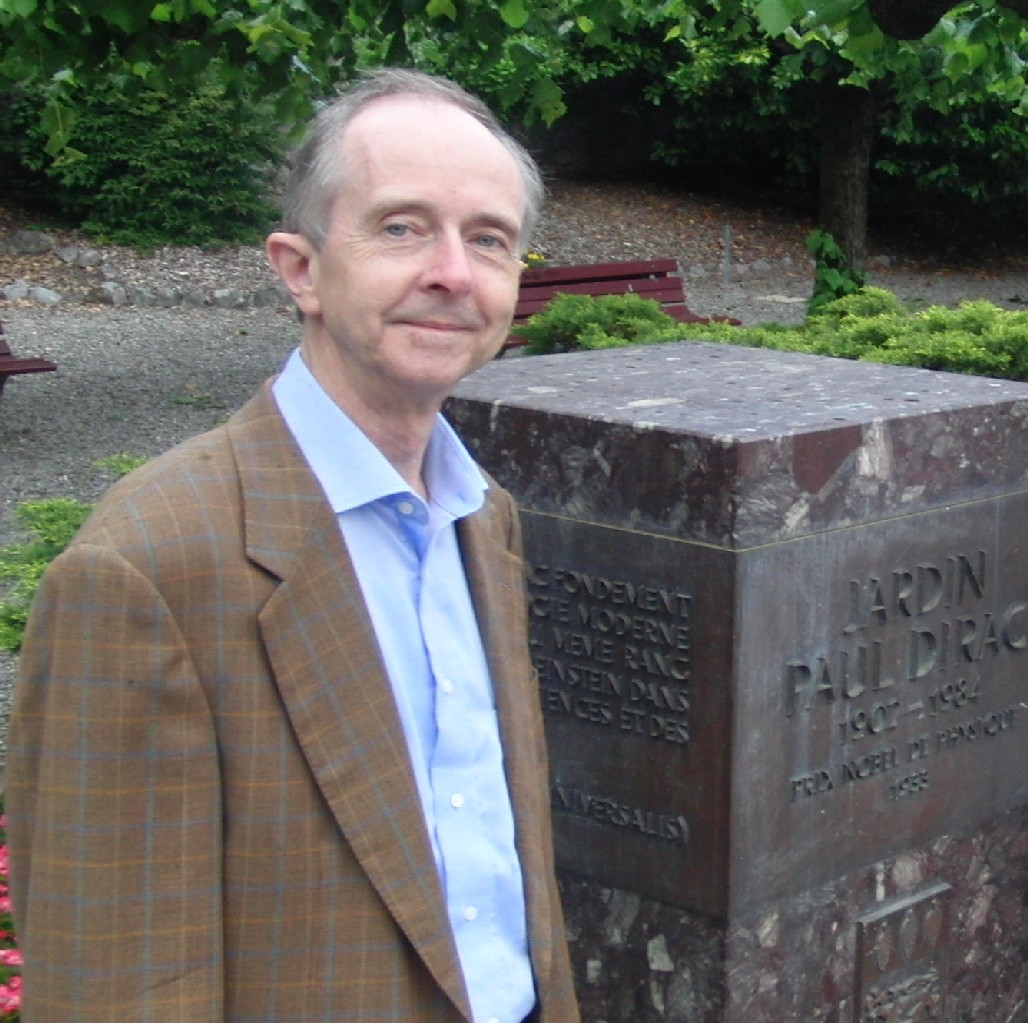
Müller in front of Paul Dirac's commemorative stone, Saint-Maurice, Switzerland.

Berndt O. Mueller (also Berndt Müller) (born 8 February 1950 in Markneukirchen, German Democratic Republic) is a German-born theoretical physicist who specializes in nuclear physics. He is a professor at Duke University.

== Life ==
Müller moved with his mother to Frankfurt am Main in 1953, where they joined his father. He enrolled as a student at the Goethe University Frankfurt in 1968 and graduated in 1972. Müller received his doctorate, with Walter Greiner as his doctoral advisor, in 1973. In 1974, he was a postdoctoral fellow at Yale University and then Research Associate at the University of Washington. From 1976 he was a professor at the Goethe University Frankfurt. He has been a professor at Duke University since 1990 (since 1996 as "JB Duke Professor of Physics"). From 1997 to 1999 he was chairman of the Faculty of Physics and from 1999 to 2004 Dean of the Faculty of Natural Sciences. He is a US citizen. He was, among other guest scientists at Caltech (1980), the University of Cape Town(1984), the Institute of Nuclear Physics of the University of Tokyo, the Yukawa Institute of the University of Kyoto and the University of Arizona (1987).

Müller is concerned with the theory of quark–gluon plasma and evidence of its formation in heavy-ion scattering experiments (via enrichment with strange quarks), but also with chaos in gauge field theories, the Casimir effect, and neural networks.

== Honours and awards ==
- 1975 — Röntgen Prize of the University of Giessen
- 1994 — Fellow of the American Physical Society
- 1998 — Senior US-Scientist Award of the Alexander von Humboldt Foundation
- 2007 — Jesse Beams Award from the American Physical Society
- 2021 — Herman Feshbach Prize in Theoretical Nuclear Physics

== Books ==
- with Walter Greiner: Quantum Mechanics 2 - Symmetries. Harri Deutsch. English: Quantum Mechanics: Symmetries. Springer 1989. 2nd.ed. 1994.
- with Walter Greiner: Theoretische Physik, Ein Lehr- und Übungsbuch, Band 8: Eichtheorieder schwachen Wechselwirkung. Harri Deutsch 1986. English: Gauge theory of weak interactions. Springer 2000. 4th ed. 2009.
- with Walter Greiner, Johann Rafelski: Quantum Electrodynamics of strong fields. Springer 1985.
- with Joachim Reinhardt, Michael Stricklandt: Neural Networks. An introduction. Springer 1991. 2nd ed. 1995.
- with T. S. Biro, S. G. Matinyan: Chaos and gauge field theory. World Scientific 1994.
- with J. Kapusta, Johann Rafelski (publisher and co-author): Quark-Gluon-Plasma. Theoretical Foundations. 2003 (reprints).
- The physics of the quark gluon plasma. Springer 1985.
- with Johann Rafelski: Die Struktur des Vakuums. Ein Dialog über das 'Nichts. Harri Deutsch 1985. English: The Structured Vacuum - thinking about nothing. Harri Deutsch 1985.
- with H. M. Fried (Editor): Vacuum structure in intense fields. Plenary Press 1991. (NATO Advanced Study Institute, Cargese 1990)
- with Robert Pisarski: Kay Kay Gee Day : Klaus Kinder-Geiger Memorial Workshop on RHIC Physics and Beyond, Upton, New York, October 1998, American Institute of Physics, 1999.

== Articles ==
- Harris, John W.; Müller, Berndt (1996). "The Search for the Quark-Gluon Plasma". Annual Review of Nuclear and Particle Science. 46: 71–107. arXiv:hep-ph/9602235. Bibcode:1996ARNPS..46...71H. doi:10.1146/annurev.nucl.46.1.71.
- with Günter Plunien, Walter Greiner: "The Casimir Effect". In: Physics Reports. Vol. 134, 1986, p. 87. doi:10.1016/0370-1573(86)90020-7
- with Peter Koch, Johann Rafelski: "Strangeness in relativistic heavy ion collisions". In: Physics Reports. Volume 142, 1986, p. 167. doi:10.1016/0370-1573(86)90096-7
- Müller, Berndt; Soff, Gerhard; Greiner, Walter; Ceaușescu, Valentin (1978). "Scaling behaviour of inner-shell ionization in superheavy quasi-molecules". Zeitschrift für Physik A. 285 (1): 27–30. Bibcode:1978ZPhyA.285...27M. doi:10.1007/BF01410218. S2CID 119420864.
- all articles by Berndt Müller registered in the Inspire-HEP database
