= Max Planck Institute for Brain Research =

Research institute in Frankfurt, Germany

Coordinates: 50°5′35″N 8°39′5″E

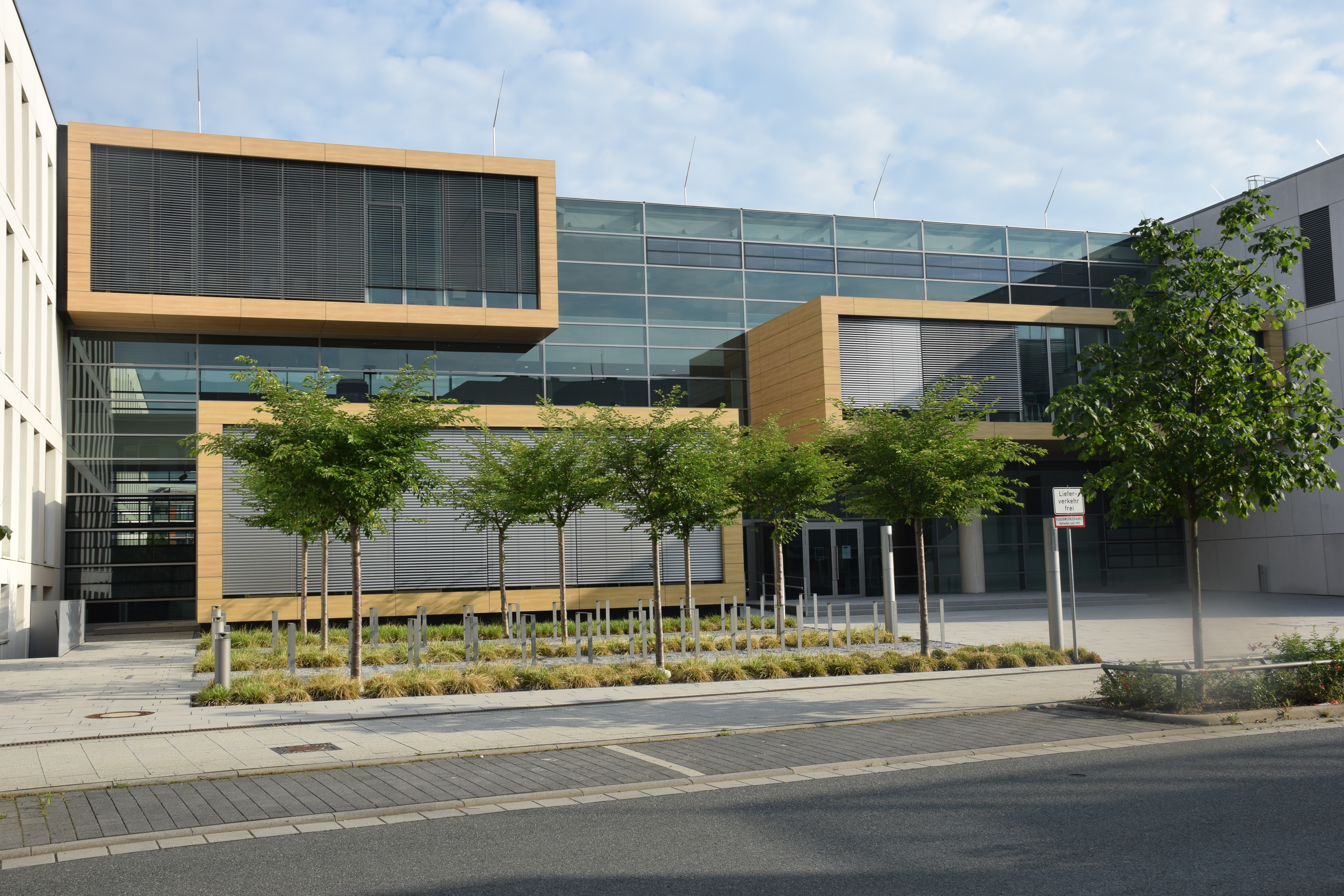
New building of the Max Planck Institute for Brain Research in Frankfurt

The Max Planck Institute for Brain Research is located in Frankfurt, Germany. It was founded as Kaiser Wilhelm Institute for Brain Research in Berlin 1914, moved to Frankfurt-Niederrad in 1962 and more recently in a new building in Frankfurt-Riedberg. It is one of 83 institutes in the Max Planck Society (Max Planck Gesellschaft).

== Research ==
Research at the Max Planck Institute for Brain Research focuses on the operation of networks of neurons in the brain. The institute hosts three scientific departments (with directors Moritz Helmstaedter of the Helmstaedter Department, Gilles Laurent of the Laurent Department, and Erin Schuman of the Schuman Department), the Singer Emeritus Group, two Max Planck Research Groups, namely Johannes Letzkus' Neocortical Circuits Group and Tatjana Tchumatchenko's Theory of Neural Dynamics Group, as well as several additional research units. The common research goal of the Institute is a mechanistic understanding of neurons and synapses, of the structural and functional circuits which they form, of the computational rules which describe their operations, and ultimately, of their roles in driving perception and behavior. The experimental focus is on all scales required to achieve this understanding - from networks of molecules in dendritic compartments to networks of interacting brain areas. This includes interdisciplinary analyses at the molecular, cellular, multi-cellular, network and behavioral levels, often combined with theoretical approaches.

== History ==
The "Kaiser-Wilhelm-Institut für Hirnforschung" (KWI for Brain Research) was founded in Berlin in 1914, making it one of the oldest institutes of the "Kaiser Wilhelm Society for the Advancement of Science", itself founded in 1911. It was based on the Neurologische Zentralstation (Neurological Center), a private research institute established by Oskar Vogt in 1898 and run together with his wife Cécile Vogt-Mugnier, also an accomplished brain researcher.

From 1901 to 1910, Vogt's coworker at this institute was Korbinian Brodmann, who in 1909 established the cytoarchitectonic classification of cortical areas still in use today (e.g., his area 17 is the primary visual cortex). Oskar Vogt's own scientific achievements also were in the field of cortical cytoarchitectonics and myeloarchitectonics.

In the 1920s, Oskar Vogt became interested in the potential morphological correlates of mental abilities, and hence in the neuroanatomical study of 'elite brains'. When Lenin died of a brain hemorrhage in 1924, his brain was preserved in formaldehyde, where it remained for two years. In 1926, Vogt was recruited by the Soviet government to help establish Lenin's genius via histological investigation of his brain. He was given some space in Moscow to carry out this work and two years later, a spacious and representative brick building that had been confiscated from an American business. In it, he helped establish and then headed the Moscow Brain Institute. Between 1926 and 1930, Vogt travelled to Moscow several times to supervise the work on Lenin's brain by the Russian collaborators who had been trained at Vogt's KWI for Brain Research in Berlin.

In 1927, Vogt gave a preliminary report on his findings in Moscow, concluding from his histological observations that Lenin must have been an athlete in associative thinking ("Assoziationsathlet") – a conclusion deemed farfetched by some of his neurologist colleagues and adversaries. Lenin's brain was, for a time, on display in the Lenin Mausoleum and now rests at Moscow's Brain Institute.

World War I delayed the plans for a new building to house the KWI for Brain Research. The KWI's first proper building in Berlin-Buch was only inaugurated in 1931 under the directorship of Oskar Vogt. It was the world's largest and most modern brain research institute of its time, including Departments of Neurophysiology (Tönnies and Kornmüller), Neurochemistry (Marthe Vogt and Veit), Genetics (Timoféeff-Ressovsky), a Research Clinic (Soeken, Zwirner), and the Neuroanatomical Departments of Oskar and his wife Cécile Vogt. Based on critical remarks Vogt had made about national socialism, a protective attitude towards Jewish coworkers at the institute, and rumors that he was a communist (spirited by his Moscow contacts), Vogt was pressed to early retirement by 1937. The Vogts moved to Neustadt in the Black Forest and established another private brain research institute, funded in part by the family of steel baron Krupp (who had already funded Vogt´s first private institute in Berlin) and by Vogt´s own funds. In 1937, Nazi physician Hugo Spatz, a pupil of Franz Nissl, became Vogt's successor as director of the KWI for Brain Research and head of the Neuroanatomy Department. During his tenure, the Departments of Neuropathology (Hallervorden) and of Tumor Research (Tönnis) were added. One focus of both Spatz’s and Julius Hallervorden’s histological research were pathologies of the extrapyramidal/motor system. In a previous collaboration they had described an extrapyramidal disease that was originally named Hallervorden-Spatz syndrome.

Between 1940 and 1945, Hallervorden and Spatz became involved in the atrocities of the Nazi regime by studying the brains of euthanasia victims. For many years, brain sections from these studies remained archived in the institute (which by then had become the Max Planck Institute for Brain Research in Frankfurt am Main) together with research material from other periods. When this was recognized, all sections dating from the period 1933-1945 were given a burial at a Munich cemetery by the Max Planck Society in 1990. A memorial stone was erected in honor of the victims of these atrocities. Use of the eponym Hallervorden-Spatz syndrome is strongly discouraged due to Hallervorden and Spatz's involvement with the Nazi party and was replaced by the more descriptive terminology pantothenate kinase-associated neurodegeneration.

After 1945, the different departments of the KWI for Brain Research were relocated to Dillenburg, Giessen, Köln, Marburg and Göttingen. In 1948 the Max Planck Society was founded to succeed the Kaiser Wilhelm Society, and the institute became the Max Planck Institute for Brain Research. Hallervorden retired as director in 1955, Spatz in 1959. In 1962, a new building was erected in Frankfurt-Niederrad to house the Departments of Neurobiology (Hassler, Director 1959-1982) and Neuropathology (Krücke, Director 1956-1979), as well as the Research Groups "Evolution of the Primate Brain" (Stephan) and "Neurochemistry" (Werner). Rolf Hassler, a pupil of Oskar Vogt and coworker of the famous Freiburg neurologist Richard Jung, studied subcortical brain areas, thalamo-cortical systems, basal ganglia and the limbic system. Wilhelm Krücke, a pupil of Hallervorden, was a renowned specialist on peripheral neuropathies. He was the reason for the institute's relocation to Frankfurt, as he was simultaneously head of the 'Edinger Institute', the Neuropathology Department of Frankfurt University's Medical School. In 1982, the KWI for Brain Research's Department of General Neurology, which had been relocated to Köln, became the Max Planck Institute for Neurological Research in that city, independent of the MPI for Brain Research. The other relocated departments of the KWI were closed with the retirement of their directors.

In 1981, the MPIH was restructured towards non-clinical, basic neuroscience through the establishment of the Departments of Neuroanatomy (Wässle, Director 1981—2008) and Neurophysiology (Singer, Director 1982—2011), followed by the Department of Neurochemistry (Betz, Director 1991—2009). Heinz Wässle conducted functional and structural studies of the mammalian retina, Heinrich Betz analyzed the molecular components of synapses, and Wolf Singer studied higher cognitive functions with a focus on the visual system.

In the first decade of the new millennium, the MPG defined the analysis of neural networks as a central research topic for the institute. In 2008, Erin Schuman and Gilles Laurent were appointed as directors of the departments "Synaptic Plasticity" and "Neural Systems", respectively. The new departments took up work in the summer of 2009 and were initially located in interim facilities on the Science Campus "Riedberg" of the Frankfurt University. The construction of a new building for the institute on this campus was recently finalized, next to the MPI of Biophysics. The new institute building currently houses the three departments of the institute (those of Erin Schuman, Gilles Laurent and Moritz Helmstaedter), several Research Groups at the institute (Tatjana Tchumatchenko and Johannes Letzkus recently joined as Max Planck Group Leaders in 2013), several core facilities, and the Max Planck Research Unit for Neurogenetics of Peter Mombaerts.

As of 2016, Moritz Helmstaedter is the Managing Director of the Institute.

== Graduate Program ==
The International Max Planck Research School (IMPRS) for Neural Circuits is a graduate program offering a Ph.D. The school is run in cooperation with the Max Planck Institute of Biophysics and the Johann Wolfgang Goethe University of Frankfurt am Main as well as the Frankfurt Institute for Advanced Studies and the Ernst Strüngmann Institute.
