= Deutsche Mark =

Currency of Germany from 1948 to 2002

Deutsche Mark (German); German mark (English); D-Mark
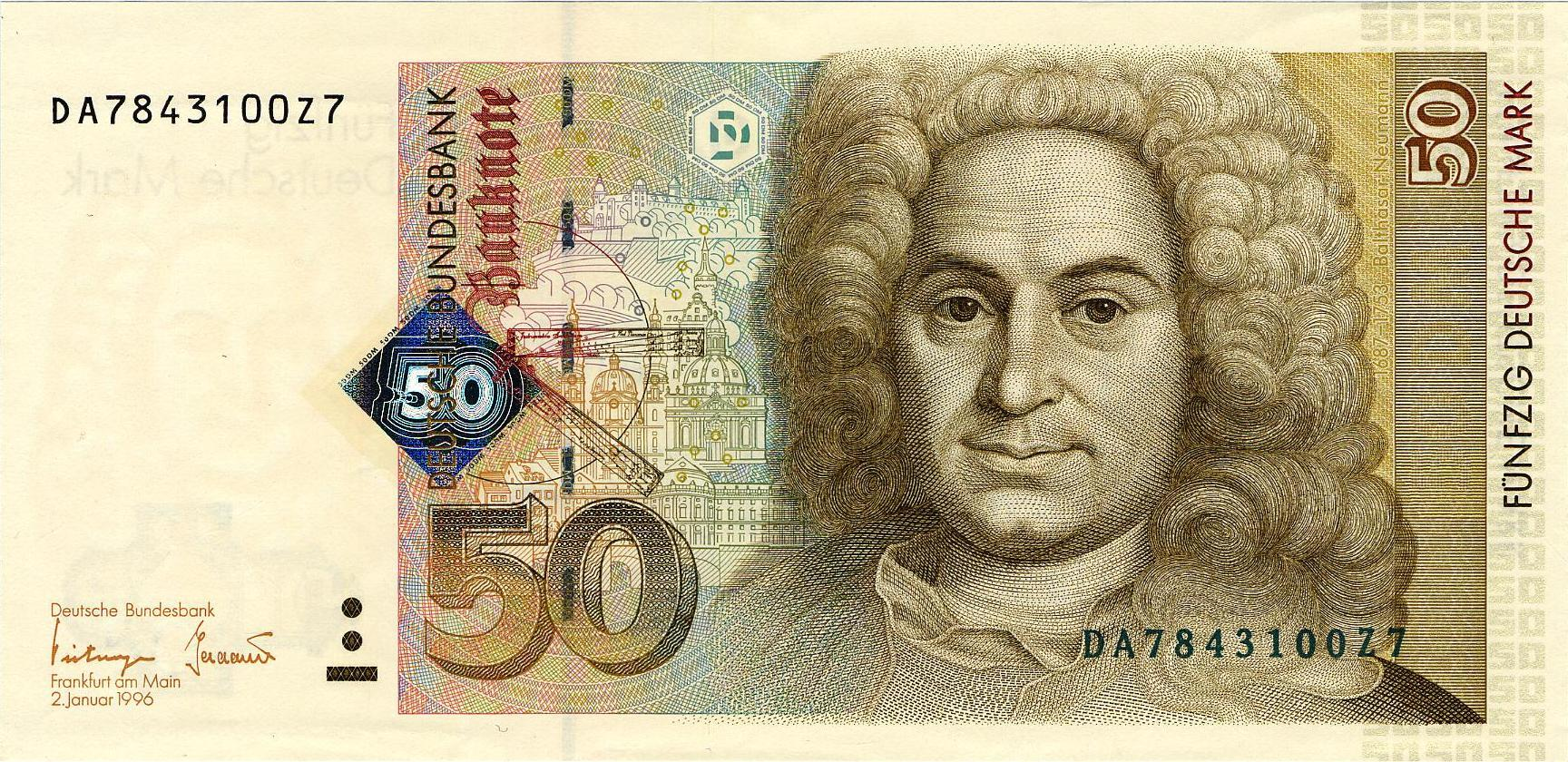
- 50 Deutsche Mark banknote from 1996

ISO 4217
- Code: DEM

Units of account
- Base unit: Mark
- Plural: Mark
- Symbol: DM
- Subunit
- 1/100: Pfennig
- Plural
- Pfennig: Pfennig
- Symbol
- Pfennig: pf

Denominations
- Banknotes
- Freq. used: DM5, DM10, DM20, DM50, DM100, DM200
- Rarely used: DM500, DM1,000
- Coins
- Freq. used: 1pf, 2pf, 5pf, 10pf, 50pf, DM1, DM2, DM5

Demographics
- Official user(s): None, previously: List: Trizone (1948–1949); West Germany (1949–1990); West Berlin (1949–1990); East Germany (July–October 1990); Germany (1990–2002)
- Unofficial users: List: UNMIK (1999–2002, formally); FR Yugoslavia (1992–2002, informally, in parallel with the Yugoslav dinar, which was pegged to it since 1994); Republic of Montenegro (1999–2002, formally in parallel with the Yugoslav dinar until 2002); Republic of Bosnia and Herzegovina (1992–1998, informally, in parallel with the Bosnia and Herzegovina dinar); Croatian Republic of Herzeg-Bosnia (1991–1996, informally, in parallel with the Bosnia and Herzegovina dinar, Croatian dinar, and Croatian kuna); Autonomous Province of Western Bosnia (1993–1995, informally, in parallel with the United States dollar, French franc, Croatian kuna, and Yugoslav dinar); UNTAES (1996–1998, informally, in parallel with the Croatian kuna and Yugoslav dinar)

Issuance
- Central bank: Deutsche Bundesbank
- Website: www.bundesbank.de
- Printer: Bundesdruckerei; Giesecke & Devrient
- Website: Bundesdruckerei; Giesecke & Devrient
- Mint: List: Bayerisches Hauptmünzamt, Munich (Mint mark: D); Hamburgische Münze (J); Staatliche Münze Berlin (A); Staatliche Münzen Baden-Württemberg, formed by Staatliche Münze Karlsruhe (G) and Staatliche Münze Stuttgart (F)
- Website: List: Munich mint; Hamburg mint; Berlin mint; Karlsruhe-Stuttgart mints

Valuation
- Inflation: 1.4%, December 2001
- Pegged by: Bosnia and Herzegovina convertible mark, Bulgarian lev at par

EU Exchange Rate Mechanism (ERM)
- Since: 13 March 1979
- Fixed rate since: 31 December 1998
- Replaced by euro, non cash: 1 January 1999
- Replaced by euro, cash: 1 March 2002
- 1 € =: DM 1.95583
- This infobox shows the latest status before this currency was rendered obsolete.

The Deutsche Mark (German: [ˈdɔʏtʃə ˈmaʁk]; 'German mark'), abbreviated "DM" or "D-Mark" ([ˈdeːˌmaʁk]), was the official currency of the Federal Republic Of Germany from 1948 until the adoption of the euro in 2002. In English, it was typically called the "Deutschmark" (/ˈdɔɪtʃmɑːrk/ DOYTCH-mark). One Deutsche Mark was divided into 100 pfennigs. From July 1990, East Germany also used the DM until acceding to the smaller FRG commonly called West Germany on 3 October, after which the unified country is called Germany.

The Deutschmark was first issued in a surprise move under Allied occupation in 1948 to replace the Reichsmark. It served as the Federal Republic of Germany's official currency from its founding the following year. On 31 December 1998, the Council of the European Union fixed the irrevocable exchange rate, effective 1 January 1999, for German mark to euros as DM 1.95583 = €1. In 1999, the Deutsche Mark was replaced by the euro; its coins and banknotes remained in circulation, defined in terms of euros, until the introduction of euro notes and coins on 1 January 2002. The Deutsche Mark ceased to be legal tender immediately upon the introduction of the euro—in contrast to the other eurozone states, where the euro and legacy currency circulated side by side for up to two months. Mark coins and banknotes continued to be accepted as valid forms of payment in Germany until 1 March 2002.

The Deutsche Bundesbank has guaranteed that all German marks in cash form may be changed into euros indefinitely, and one may do so in person at any branch of the Bundesbank in Germany. Banknotes and coins can even be sent to the Bundesbank by mail. In 2012, it was estimated that as many as 13.2 billion marks were in circulation, with one poll from 2011 showing a narrow majority of Germans favouring the currency's restoration (although only a minority believed this would bring any economic benefit). Polls in the early 2020s indicated only a minority of Germans supported reintroduction of the Deutsche Mark.

== History ==
=== Before 1871 ===
A mark had been the currency of Germany since its original unification in 1871. Before that time, the different German states issued a variety of different currencies, the most common being the North German thaler and the South German gulden. By 1857, both currencies were linked to the Vereinsthaler, a silver coin containing 16 2/3 grams of pure silver. Although the German gold mark was based on gold rather than silver (at 2.79 marks per gram of fine gold), a fixed exchange rate between the Vereinsthaler and the mark of 3 marks = 1 Vereinsthaler was used for the conversion.

=== 1873–1948 ===
The first mark, known as the Goldmark, was introduced in 1873. With the outbreak of World War I, the mark was taken off the gold standard. The currency thus became known as the Papiermark, especially as high inflation, then hyperinflation occurred and the currency became exclusively made up of paper money. The Papiermark was replaced by the Rentenmark (RM) from 15 November 1923, and the Reichsmark (ℛ︁ℳ︁) in 1924.

=== Early military occupation following WWII ===
During the first two years of occupation the occupying powers of France, United Kingdom, United States, and the Soviet Union were not able to successfully negotiate a possible currency reform in Germany. Due to the strains between the Allies each zone was governed independently as regards monetary matters. The US occupation policy was governed by the directive JCS 1067 (in effect until July 1947), which forbade the US military governor "to take any steps to strengthen German financial structure". As a consequence a separate monetary reform in the U.S. zone was not possible. Each of the Allies printed its own occupation currency.

=== Currency reform of June 1948 ===
The Deutsche Mark was officially introduced on Sunday 20 June 1948 by Ludwig Erhard. Large amounts were exchanged at the rate of 10 ℛ︁ℳ︁ to 65 pf. In addition, each person received a per capita allowance of DM 60 in two parts: the first was DM 40 and the second DM 20. Edward A. Tenenbaum managed the group of 11 experts that devised the currency reform, and also created "Deutsche Mark", a temporary name that became permanent.

A few weeks later Erhard, acting against orders, issued an edict abolishing many economic controls which had been originally implemented by the Nazis, and which the Allies had not removed. He did this, as he often confessed, on Sunday because the offices of the American, British, and French occupation authorities were closed that day. He was sure that if he had done it when they were open, they would have countermanded the order.

The introduction of the new currency was intended to protect western Germany from a second wave of hyperinflation and to stop the rampant barter and black market trade (where cigarettes were used as currency). Although the new currency was initially only distributed in the three western occupation zones outside Berlin, the move angered the Soviet authorities, who regarded it as a threat. The Soviets promptly cut off all road, rail and canal links between the three western zones and West Berlin, starting the Berlin Blockade. In response, the U.S. and Britain launched an airlift of food and coal and distributed the new currency in West Berlin as well.

==== Economics of 1948 currency reform ====
Since the 1930s, prices and wages had been controlled, but money had been plentiful. That meant that people had accumulated large paper assets, and that official prices and wages did not reflect reality, as the black market dominated the economy and more than half of all transactions were taking place unofficially. The reform replaced the old money with the new Deutsche Mark at the rate of one new per ten old. This wiped out 90% of government and private debt, as well as private savings. Prices were decontrolled, and labor unions agreed to accept a 15% wage increase, despite the 25% rise in prices. The result was that the prices of German export products held steady, while profits and earnings from exports soared and were poured back into the economy. The currency reforms were simultaneous with the $1.4 billion in Marshall Plan money coming in from the United States, which was primarily used for investment. In addition, the Marshall plan forced German companies, as well as those in the rest of Western Europe, to modernize their business practices, and to take account of the wider market.

Marshall Plan funding overcame bottlenecks in the surging economy caused by the remaining controls (which were removed in 1949), and opened up a greatly expanded market for German exports. Overnight, consumer goods appeared in the stores, because they could be sold for higher prices. While the availability of consumer goods is seen as a giant success story by most historians of the present, the perception at the time was a different one: prices were so high that average people could not afford to shop, especially since prices were free-ranging but wages still fixed by law. Therefore, in the summer of 1948 a giant wave of strikes and demonstrations swept over West Germany, leading to an incident in Stuttgart where strikers were met by US tanks ("Stuttgarter Vorfälle"). Only after the wage freeze was abandoned were Deutschmark and free-ranging prices were accepted by the population.

==== Currency reform in the Soviet occupation zone ====
In the Soviet occupation zone of Germany (later the German Democratic Republic), the East German mark (also named "Deutsche Mark" from 1948 to 1964 and colloquially referred to as the Ostmark—literally Eastmark) was introduced a few days afterwards in the form of Reichsmark and Rentenmark notes with adhesive stamps to stop the flooding in of Reichsmark and Rentenmark notes from the West. In July 1948, a completely new series of East German mark banknotes was issued.

==== Bank deutscher Länder and the Deutsche Bundesbank ====
Later in 1948, the Bank deutscher Länder ("Bank of the German States") assumed responsibility, followed in 1957 by the Deutsche Bundesbank. The Deutsche Mark earned a reputation as a strong store of value at times when other national currencies succumbed to periods of inflation. It became a source of national pride and an anchor for the country's economic prosperity, particularly during the years of the Wirtschaftswunder in the 1950s.

=== Currency union with the Saarland ===
The population in the Saar Protectorate rejected in a referendum the proposal to turn it into a "European territory". Despite French pre-referendum claims that a "no" vote would mean that the Saar would remain a French protectorate it in fact resulted in the incorporation of the Saar into the Federal Republic of Germany on 1 January 1957. The new German member state of the Saarland maintained its currency, the Saar franc, which was in a currency union at par with the French franc. On 9 July 1959 the Deutsche Mark replaced the Saar franc at a ratio of 100 francs = DM 0.8507.

=== German reunification ===
The Deutsche Mark played an important role in the German reunification in 1990. Citizens of the German Democratic Republic aka. East Germany only had the Deutsche Mark East, derided as "aluminium chips", roughly worth a fifth of the Western Mark in reality, at low amounts only. Soon, they called for adoption of the Western currency, with the slogan "Kommt die D-Mark dann bleiben wir, kommt sie nicht gehen wir zu ihr" (If the DM comes we will stay here, if it does not come we will go there).

It was introduced as the official currency of East Germany in July 1990, replacing the East German mark (Mark der DDR), in preparation for unification on 3 October 1990. East German marks were exchanged for Deutsche Marks at a rate of 1:1 for the first M 4,000 and 2:1 for larger amounts. Before reunification, each citizen of East Germany coming to West Germany was given Begrüßungsgeld (welcome money), a per capita allowance of DM 100 in cash. The government of Germany and the Bundesbank were in major disagreement over the exchange rate between the East German mark and the German mark.

France and the United Kingdom were opposed to German reunification, and attempted to influence the Soviet Union to stop it. However, in late 1989 France extracted German commitment to the Monetary Union in return for support for German reunification.

== Stability ==
The German mark had a reputation as one of the world's most stable currencies; this was based on the monetary policy of the Bundesbank. The policy was "hard" in relation to the policies of certain other central banks in Europe. The "hard" and "soft" was in respect to the aims of inflation and political interference. This policy was the foundation of the European Central Bank's present policy towards the euro. The German mark's stability was greatly apparent in 1993, when speculation on the French franc and other European currencies caused a change in the European Exchange Rate Mechanism. However, it should be remembered that "hard" is relative only if it is compared to other currencies, as in its 53-year history, the purchasing power of the German mark was reduced by over 70%.

== Coins ==
The first Deutsche Mark coins were issued by the Bank deutscher Länder in 1948 and 1949. From 1950, the inscription Bundesrepublik Deutschland (Federal Republic of Germany) appeared on the coins. These coins were issued in denominations of 1pf, 2pf, 5pf, 10pf, and 50pf. The 1pf and 2pf coins were struck in bronze clad steel (although during some years the 2pf was issued in solid bronze) while 5pf and 10pf were brass clad steel and the 50-pfennig was in cupronickel. In 1950, cupronickel DM1 coins were released, while a cupronickel DM2 and a .625 silver DM5 were released in 1951. Cupronickel replaced silver in the DM5 in 1975. The DM2 and DM5 coins have often been used for commemorative themes, though typically only the generic design for the DM5 is intended for circulation. Commemorative silver DM10 coins have also been issued which have periodically found their way into circulation. Unlike other European countries, Germany retained the use of the smallest coins (1pf and 2pf) until adoption of the euro.

Coins of the Deutsche Mark
Image	Value	Technical parameters			Description			Issued from
Image	Value	Diameter (mm)	Mass (g)	Composition	Edge	Obverse	Reverse	Issued from
	1 pf	16.5	2.00	Bronze-plated steel	Smooth	Rye stalks; value	Oak branch; lettering: Bundesrepublik Deutschland; value	1948–1949
	1 pf	16.5	2.00	Copper-plated steel	Smooth	Rye stalks; value	Oak branch; lettering: Bundesrepublik Deutschland; value	1950–2001
	2 pf	19.25	3.25	Bronze	Smooth	Rye stalks; value	Oak branch; lettering: Bundesrepublik Deutschland; value	1949–1968
	2 pf	19.25	2.90	Copper-plated steel	Smooth	Rye stalks; value	Oak branch; lettering: Bundesrepublik Deutschland; value	1968–2001
	5 pf	18.50	3.00	Brass-plated steel	Smooth	Rye stalks; value	Oak branch; lettering: Bundesrepublik Deutschland; value	1949–2001
	10 pf	21.50	4.00	Brass-plated steel	Smooth	Rye stalks; value	Oak branch; lettering: Bundesrepublik Deutschland; value	1949–2001
	50 pf	20.00	3.50	Cupronickel	Reeded	Value; lettering: Bundesrepublik Deutschland	Sower with an oak seedling	1949–1971
	50 pf	20.00	3.50	Cupronickel	Smooth	Value; lettering: Bundesrepublik Deutschland	Sower with an oak seedling	1972–2001
	DM 1	23.50	5.50	Cupronickel	Ornamental	Oak leaves; value; year of issue	German eagle; lettering: Bundesrepublik Deutschland	1950–2001
	DM 2	25.50	7.00	Cupronickel	Lettering: EINIGKEIT UND; RECHT UND; FREIHEIT; oak leaves	Rye stalks and grapes; value	German eagle; lettering: Bundesrepublik Deutschland	1951–1956
	DM 2	26.75	7.00	Cupronickel	Lettering: EINIGKEIT UND; RECHT UND; FREIHEIT; oak leaves	Max Planck	German eagle; value; year of issue; lettering: Bundesrepublik Deutschland	1957–1971
	DM 2	26.75	7.00	Magnimat: Cupronickel- plated nickel	Lettering: EINIGKEIT UND; RECHT UND; FREIHEIT; oak leaves	Konrad Adenauer	German eagle; value; year of issue; lettering: Bundesrepublik Deutschland	1969–1987
	DM 2	26.75	7.00	Magnimat: Cupronickel- plated nickel	Lettering: EINIGKEIT UND; RECHT UND; FREIHEIT; oak leaves	Theodor Heuss	German eagle; value; year of issue; lettering: Bundesrepublik Deutschland	1970–1987
	DM 2	26.75	7.00	Magnimat: Cupronickel- plated nickel	Lettering: EINIGKEIT UND; RECHT UND; FREIHEIT; oak leaves	Kurt Schumacher	German eagle; value; year of issue; lettering: Bundesrepublik Deutschland	1979–1993
	DM 2	26.75	7.00	Magnimat: Cupronickel- plated nickel	Lettering: EINIGKEIT UND; RECHT UND; FREIHEIT; oak leaves	Ludwig Erhard	German eagle; value; year of issue; lettering: Bundesrepublik Deutschland	1988–2001
	DM 2	26.75	7.00	Magnimat: Cupronickel- plated nickel	Lettering: EINIGKEIT UND; RECHT UND; FREIHEIT; oak leaves	Franz Josef Strauss	German eagle; value; year of issue; lettering: Bundesrepublik Deutschland	1990–2001
	DM 2	26.75	7.00	Magnimat: Cupronickel- plated nickel	Lettering: EINIGKEIT UND; RECHT UND; FREIHEIT; oak leaves	Willy Brandt	German eagle; value; year of issue; lettering: Bundesrepublik Deutschland	1994–2001
	DM 5	29.00	11.20	Silver: 62.5% Copper: 37.5%	Lettering: EINIGKEIT UND; RECHT UND; FREIHEIT; oak leaves	Value; year of issue; lettering: Bundesrepublik Deutschland	German eagle	1951–1974
	DM 5	29.00	10.00	Magnimat: Cupronickel- plated nickel	Lettering: EINIGKEIT UND; RECHT UND; FREIHEIT; eagles	Value; lettering: Bundesrepublik Deutschland	German eagle; year of issue	1975–2001

Unlike other countries (such as Australia) there was no attempt or proposal suggested for the withdrawal of the 1pf and 2pf coins. Both coins were still in circulation in 2001 and supermarkets in particular still marked prices to the nearest pfennig. This penchant for accuracy continues with the euro (while Finland or the Netherlands for example, price to the nearest 5 cents) with the 1-cent coin still encountered in Germany.

There were a considerable number of commemorative silver DM 5 and DM 10 coins, which actually had the status of legal tender but were rarely seen outside of collectors' circles.

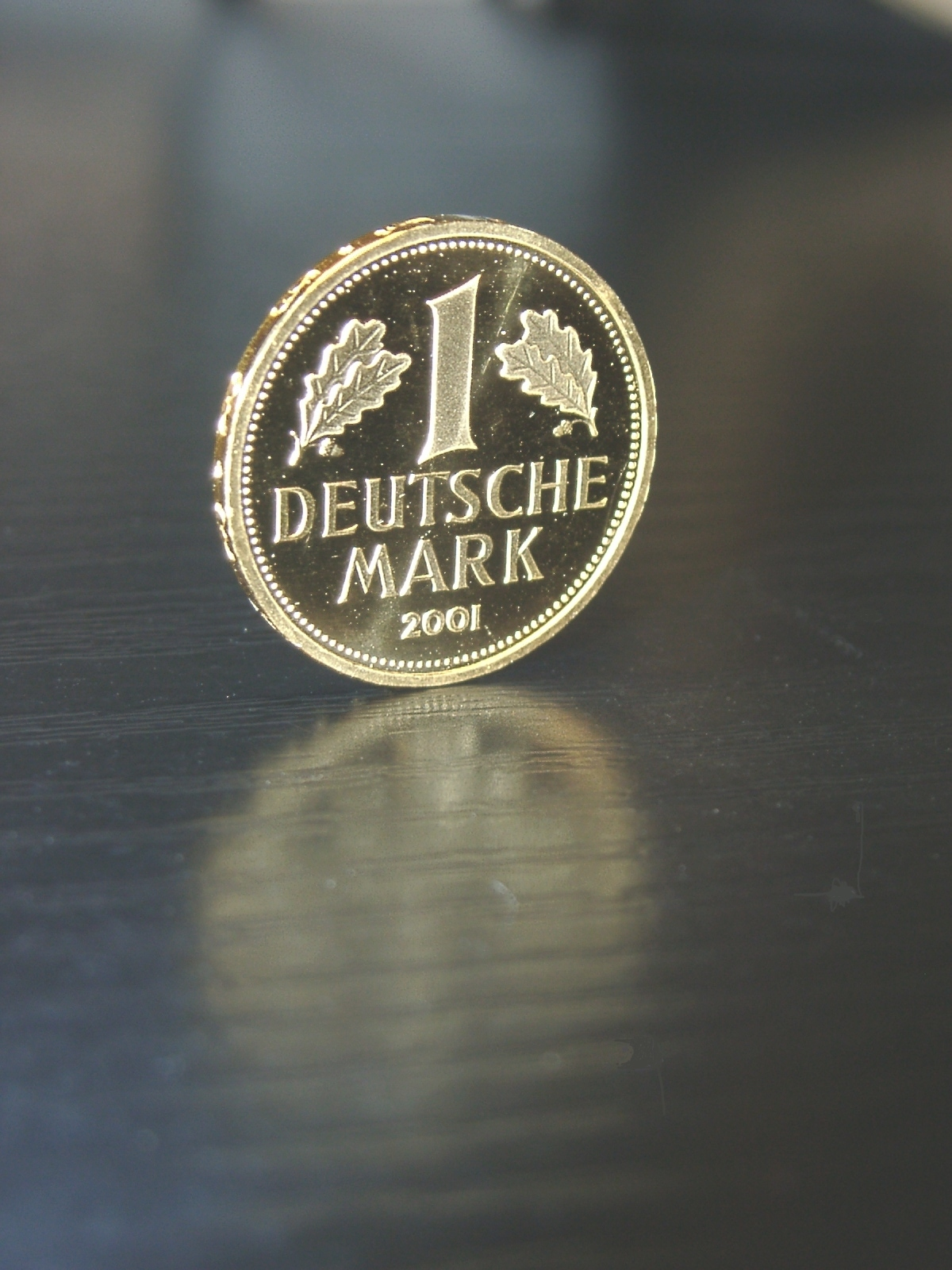
Obverse view of the 2001 special gold issue of the DM1 coin

On 27 December 2000, the German government enacted a law authorizing the Bundesbank to issue, in 2001, a special .999 pure gold DM 1 coin commemorating the end of the German mark. The coin had the exact design and dimensions of the circulating cupro-nickel DM 1 coin, with the exception of the inscription on the reverse, which read Deutsche Bundesbank (instead of Bundesrepublik Deutschland), as the Bundesbank was the issuing authority in this case. A total of one million gold DM 1 coins were minted (200,000 at each of the five mints) and were sold beginning in mid-2001 through German coin dealers on behalf of the Bundesbank. The issue price varied by the dealer but averaged approximately US$165.

German coins bear a mint mark, indicating where the coin was minted. D indicates Munich, F Stuttgart, G Karlsruhe and J Hamburg. Coins minted during the Second World War include the mint marks A (Berlin), B (Vienna), and E (Muldenhütten). The mint mark A was also used for German mark coins minted in Berlin beginning in 1990 following the reunification of Germany. These mint marks have been continued on the German euro coins.

Between 1 July 1990 (the currency union with East Germany) and 1 July 1991, East German coins in denominations up to 50 pfennigs continued to circulate as Deutsche Mark coins at their face value, owing to a temporary shortage of small coins. These coins were legal tender only in the territory of the former East Germany.

=== Colloquial expressions ===
In colloquial German the 10pf coin was sometimes called a groschen (compare: groat). Likewise, sechser ('sixer') could refer to a coin of 5pf. Both colloquialisms refer to several pre-1871 currencies of the previously independent states (notably Prussia), where a groschen was subdivided into 12 pfennigs, hence half a groschen into 6. After 1871, 12 old pfennigs would be converted into 10pf of the mark, hence 10pf coins inherited the groschen name and 5pf coins inherited the sechser name. Both usages are only regional and may not be understood in areas where a groschen coin did not exist before 1871. In particular, the usage of sechser is less widespread. In northern Germany the DM 5 coin used to be also called a Heiermann, whereas in Bavaria the DM 2 coin was called Zwickl and this expression is now used for the €2 coin in the region.

== Banknotes ==
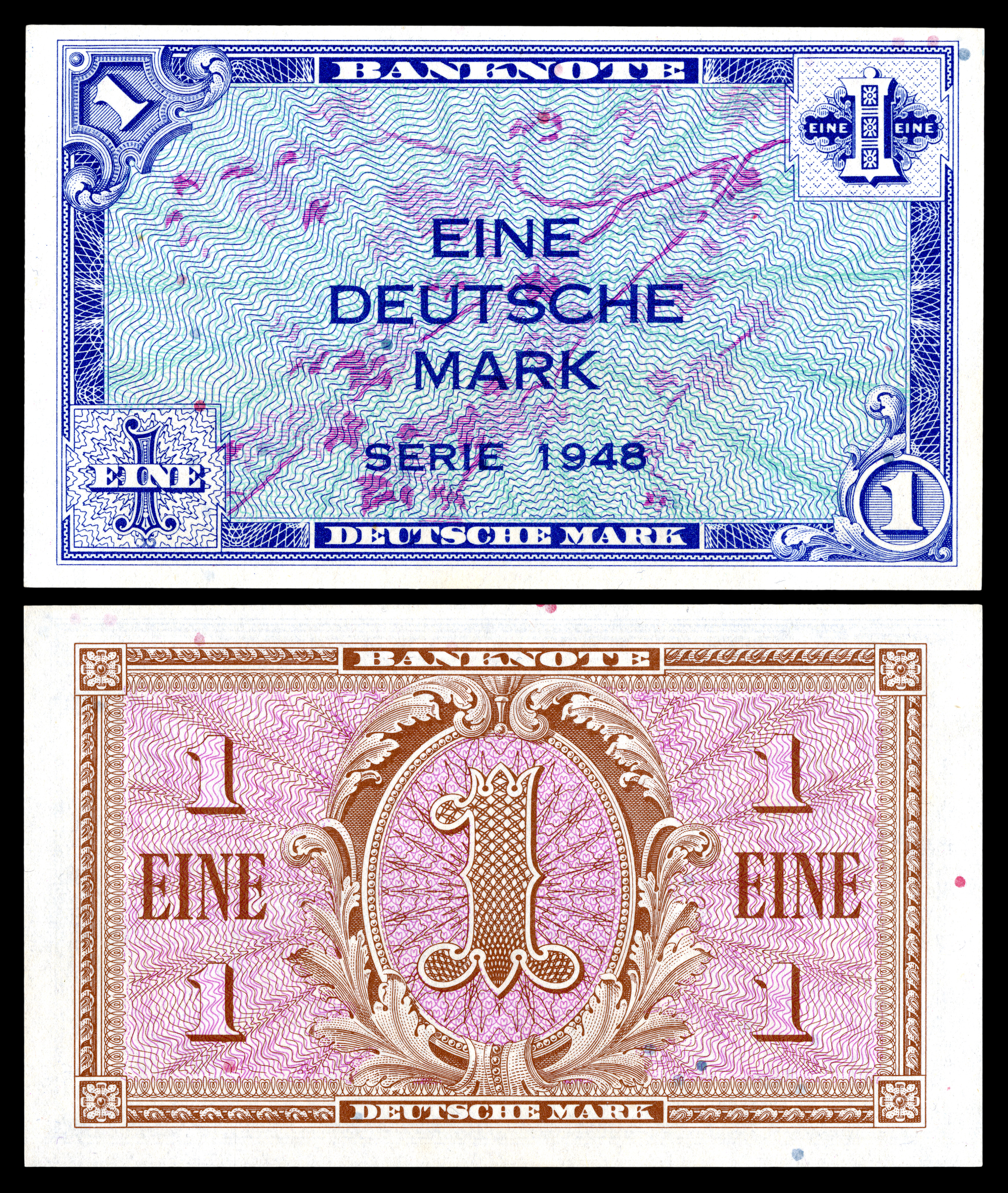
One Deutsche Mark (1948), first series, Allied military issue

There were four series of German mark banknotes:

- The first was issued in 1948 by the Allied military. There were denominations of DM1/2, DM 1, DM 2, DM 5, DM 10, DM 20, DM 50 and DM 100, with two designs of DM 20 and DM 50.
- The second series (BdL) was introduced in 1948 by the Bank deutscher Länder, an institution of the western occupation government. The designs were similar to the US Dollar and French franc, as the job of designing and printing the different denominations was shared between the Bank of France and the American Bank Note Company. There were denominations of 5pf and 10pf, DM 5, DM 10, DM 20, DM 50 and DM 100 marks. The last of the banknotes (DM 5 and DM 10) were phased out by 31 July 1966.
- The third series (I/Ia BBk) was introduced in 1960 by the Bundesbank, depicting neutral symbols, paintings by the German painters, and buildings. There were denominations of DM 5, DM 10, DM 20, DM 50, DM 100, DM 500 and DM 1,000. The series ceased to be legal tender on 30 June 1995.
- The fourth (BBk III/III a) was introduced in 1990 by the Bundesbank to counter advances in forgery technology. The notes depicted German artists and scientists together with symbols and tools of their trade. This series added a DM200 denomination, to decrease the use of DM 100 banknotes, which made up 54% of all circulating banknotes, and to fill the gap between the DM 100 and DM 500 denominations. In 1997–1998, new versions of DM 50, DM 100 and DM 200 were issued with improved security elements.

The notes with a value greater than DM 200 were rarely seen. A reserve series (BBk II) was commissioned on 1 July 1960, consisting of DM 10, DM 20, DM 50 and DM 100 banknotes. 670 million BBk II banknotes in value of 25 billion marks were printed. The notes were printed between 1963 and 1974 in fear if the Eastern Bloc would start systematically counterfeiting the BBk I series of banknotes to cripple the economy, then they would quickly be replaced by emergency notes. Another reserve series for West Berlin (BBk IIa) was commissioned on 1 July 1963, consisting of DM 5, DM 10, DM 20, DM 50 and DM 100 banknotes. 115 million West Berlin banknotes were printed, total value 4 billion marks. 15 billion marks worth of the banknotes were held in Bundesbank's custom-built underground bunker in Cochem in Rheinland-Pfalz, the rest was stored in Bundesbank's vault in Frankfurt.

=== Banknotes of the third series (BBk I/Ia) ===
In 1957, with Bank deutscher Länder and the states' central banks merging to form the Bundesbank, new banknotes were being designed, as "Bank deutscher Länder" on the previous series was no longer correct. The previous series' notes had been made out of less durable paper and had a rather short life. While previously damaged notes could be replaced from reserve stocks, this stock was also coming to an end, necessitating a reprint.

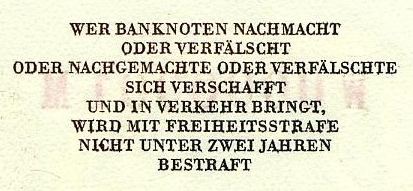
The penalty for counterfeiting and forgery of banknotes (imprisonment at least two years) appeared on the upper right corner of the reverse of all third series banknotes. Note this is the post-1970 variant, featuring "Freiheitsstrafe" ("imprisonment") instead of "Zuchthaus" (roughly "hard labour prison").

Typical security features at the time were guilloches, a multi-level head watermark and a security thread. Note numbers that fluoresced under UV light and green, yellow, and blue. 27 fluorescent fibers embedded in the paper appeared on most banknotes; however, some specimens without these features were in circulation. Starting in 1976, banknotes were equipped with machine-readable feature - a colorless inorganic oxide mixture applied to the security thread. Banknotes featuring that were designated BBk Ia within the Bundesbank. All banknotes of the third series bore the penalty for counterfeiting and forgery on the upper right corner of the reverse, from German penal code section 146: "Wer Banknoten nachmacht oder verfälscht, oder nachgemachte oder verfälschte sich verschafft und in Verkehr bringt, wird mit Zuchthaus/Freiheitsstrafe nicht unter zwei Jahren bestraft." ("Who falsifies or counterfeits banknotes, or procures falsified or counterfeit banknotes and releases them into circulation, is liable to imprisonment for at least two years".)

The third series banknotes entered circulation on 10 February 1961, with the DM 20 note. DM 100 and DM 50 followed next year, and DM 5 and DM 10 in 1963. High-denomination DM 1000 and DM 500 followed in 1964 and 1965, respectively.

The banknotes were printed exclusively in West Germany; in Bundesdruckerei in West Berlin and in Giesecke+Devrient in Munich. The third series banknotes ceased to be legal tender on 30 June 1995, when the fourth series notes had been in circulation for 3–5 years. There were a total of five issues of the third series, main differences being the dates, and signatures of the presidents and vice presidents of Bundesbank:

Issue	Date	President	Vice President	Notable other changes
1	2 January 1960	Karl Blessing	Heinrich Troeger	
2	2 January 1970	Karl Klasen	Otmar Emminger	"Zuchthaus" has been replaced with "Freiheitsstrafe" following 1969 Great Penal Code Reform
3	1 June 1977	Otmar Emminger	Karl Otto Pöhl	Machine-readable "M" feature, now designated BBk Ia
4	2 January 1980	Karl Otto Pöhl	Helmut Schlesinger	
5	2 January 1980	Karl Otto Pöhl	Helmut Schlesinger	"Deutsche Bundesbank" copyright notice with year of the denomination's first issue added on the bottom of the reverse

1960 series
Face value	Image		Dimensions	Main color	Description		Date of	
Face value	Obverse	Reverse	Dimensions	Main color	Obverse	Reverse	Issue	Withdrawal
DM 5			120×60 mm	Olive Green	Portrait of a Venetian Woman by Albrecht Dürer (1505)	A branch with oak leaves and acorns symbolizes German nature	6/5/1963	30/6/1995
DM 10			130×65 mm	Blue	Beardless Young Man by Lucas Cranach the Elder (1500)	Training ship Gorch Fock symbolizes German cosmopolitanism	21/10/1963	30/6/1995
DM 20			140×70 mm	Green	Portrait of Elsbeth Tucher, née Pusch by Albrecht Dürer (1499)	A violin and a clarinet symbolizes the world of German music	10/2/1961	30/6/1995
DM 50			150×75 mm	Brown	Portrait of Hans Urmiller from Portrait of Hans Urmiller and his Son by Barthel Beham (1525)	Holstentor in Lübeck symbolizes German civic pride	18/6/1962	30/6/1995
DM 100			160×80 mm	Blue	Cosmograph Sebastian Münster by Christoph Amberger (1552)	An eagle with stretched-out wings (Federal Eagle) symbolizes German state awareness	26/2/1962	30/6/1995
DM 500			170×85 mm	Red	Portrait of a beardless man by Hans Maler zu Schwaz (1521)	Burg Eltz in Rhineland-Palatinate symbolizes German chivalry	26/4/1965	30/6/1995
DM 1000			180×90 mm	Brown	Portrait of Dr. Johannes Scheyring by Lucas Cranach the Elder (1529)	Limburg Cathedral symbolizes Romanesque architecture in Germany	27/7/1964	30/6/1995
For table standards, see the banknote specification table.

=== Banknotes of the fourth series ===
The design of German banknotes remained unchanged during the 1960s, 1970s and 1980s. During this period, forgery technology made significant advances and so, in the late 1980s, the Bundesbank decided to issue a new series of Deutsche Mark banknotes. The colours for each denomination remained unchanged from the previous series but the designs underwent significant changes and a DM 200 denomination was introduced. Famous national artists and scientists were chosen to be portrayed on the new banknotes. Male and female artists were chosen in equal numbers. The buildings in the background of the notes' obverses had a close relationship to the person displayed (e.g., place of birth, place of death, place of work), as well as the second background picture (Lyra and the musician Schumann). The reverses of the notes refer to the work of the person on the obverse.

The new security features were: a windowed security thread (with the notes' denominations in microprinting), watermarks, microprinting, intaglio printing (viewing-angle dependent visibility as well as a Braille representation of the notes denomination), colour-shifting ink (on the DM 500 and DM 1000 denominations), a see-through registration device and ultraviolet-visible security features.

First to be issued were the DM 100 and DM 200 denominations on 1 October 1990, two days before the reunification (although the banknote shows "Frankfurt am Main, 2. Januar 1989"). The next denomination was DM 10 on 16 April 1991, followed by DM 50 on 30 September 1991. Next was the DM 20 note on 20 March 1992 (printed on 2 August 1991). The reason for this gradual introduction was, that public should become familiar with one single denomination, before introducing a new one. The change was finished with the introduction of the DM 5, DM 500, and DM 1000 denominations on 27 October 1992. The DM 500, and DM 1000 denominations were rarely seen in circulation due to value and all were introduced in one step. With the advance of forgery technology, the Bundesbank decided to introduce additional security features on the most important denominations (DM 50, DM 100 and DM 200) as of 1996. These were a hologram foil in the center of the note's obverse, a matted printing on the note's right obverse, showing its denomination (like on the reverse of the new euro banknotes), and the EURion constellation on the note's reverse. Furthermore, the colours were changed slightly to hamper counterfeiting.

Fourth series; BBk III/IIIa Designer: Reinhold Gerstetter
Image		Value	Euro equi.	Dimensions (mm)	Main colour	Description		Printed from	First issued
Obverse	Reverse	Value	Euro equi.	Dimensions (mm)	Main colour	Obverse person/historical city	Reverse	Printed from	First issued
		DM 5	€2.56	122 × 62	Green	Bettina von Arnim; Berlin	Brandenburg Gate	1991	27/10/1992
		DM 10	€5.11	130 × 65	Purple	Carl Friedrich Gauss; Göttingen	Sextant	1989–1999	16/4/1991
		DM 20	€10.23	138 × 68	Aqua	Annette von Droste- Hülshoff; Meersburg	Quill; European beech	1991–1993	20/3/1992
		DM 50	€25.56	146 × 71	Olive	Balthasar Neumann; Würzburg	Würzburg Residence	1989	30/9/1991
		DM 50	€25.56	146 × 71	Olive	Balthasar Neumann; Würzburg	Würzburg Residence	1996	2/2/1998
		DM 100	€51.13	154 × 74	Blue	Clara Schumann; Leipzig	Grand piano	1989–1993	1/10/1990
		DM 100	€51.13	154 × 74	Blue	Clara Schumann; Leipzig	Grand piano	1996	1/8/1997
		DM 200	€102.26	162 × 77	Orange	Paul Ehrlich; Frankfurt am Main	Microscope	1989	1/10/1990
		DM 200	€102.26	162 × 77	Orange	Paul Ehrlich; Frankfurt am Main	Microscope	1996	1/8/1997
		DM 500	€255.65	170 × 80	Red	Maria Sibylla Merian; Nuremberg	Dandelion, inchworm, butterfly	1991–1993	27/10/1992
		DM 1000	€511.29	178 × 83	Brown	Wilhelm and Jacob; Grimm; Kassel	Deutsches Wörterbuch; Alte Bibliothek	1991–1993	27/10/1992
For table standards, see the banknote specification table.

== Spelling and pronunciation ==
The German name of the currency is Deutsche Mark (fem., German pronunciation: [ˈdɔʏtʃə ˈmaʁk]); its plural form in standard German is the same as the singular. In German, the adjective "deutsche" (adjective for "German" in feminine singular nominative form) is capitalized because it is part of a proper name, while the noun "Mark", like all German nouns, is always capitalized. The English loanword "Deutschmark" has a slightly different spelling and one syllable fewer (possibly due to the frequency of silent e in English, or due to English's lack of adjectival endings), and a plural form in -s.

In Germany and other German speaking countries, the currency's name was often abbreviated as D-Mark (fem., [ˈdeːmaʁk]) or simply Mark (fem.) with the latter term also often used in English. Like Deutsche Mark, D-Mark and Mark do not take the plural in German when used with numbers (like all names of units), the singular being used to refer to any amount of money (e.g. eine (one) Mark and dreißig (thirty) Mark). Sometimes, a very colloquial plural form of Mark, Märker [ˈmɛʁkɐ] was used either as hypocoristic form or to refer to a small number of D-Mark coins or bills, e.g. Gib mir mal ein paar Märker ("Just give me a few marks") and Die lieben Märker wieder ("The lovely money again", with an ironic undertone).

The subdivision unit is spelled Pfennig (masc.; [ˈpfɛnɪç]), which unlike Mark does have a commonly used plural form: Pfennige ([ˈpfɛnɪɡə]), but the singular could also be used instead with no difference in meaning. (e.g.: ein (one) Pfennig, dreißig (thirty) Pfennige or dreißig (thirty) Pfennig). The official form is singular.

== Reserve currency ==
Before the switch to the euro, the Deutsche Mark was the largest international reserve currency after the United States dollar.

The percental composition of currencies of official foreign exchange reserves from 1995 to 2025.

== See also ==
- Economy of Germany
- Adoption of the euro in Germany
- German euro coins
- German Papiermark and Notgeld
- German Reichsmark
- List of commemorative coins of Germany

Preceded by: Reichsmark, Rentenmark, AM-Mark; Reason: intended to protect West Germany from the second wave of hyperinflation and stop the rampant barter and black market trade Ratio: 1 DM = 1 RM (either) below 600 RM; 1 DM = 10 RM above 600 RM and each person received 40 DM	Currency of West Germany (incl. West Berlin); 21 (24 W-Berlin) June 1948 – 30 June 1990; Note: except of the state of the Saarland (1957–1959)	Currency of Germany; 1 July 1990 – 31 December 2001; Note: euro existed as money of account since 1 January 1999, with DM coins and banknotes being the German appearance of the euro	Succeeded by: Euro; Reason: deployment of euro cash Ratio: 1 euro = 1.95583 Deutsche Mark
Preceded by: French franc and Saar Franc; Reason: currency union (9 July 1959), after the Saarland had joined West Germany (1 January 1957); Ratio: 100 Francs = 0.8507 Deutsche Mark	Currency of West Germany (incl. West Berlin); 21 (24 W-Berlin) June 1948 – 30 June 1990; Note: except of the state of the Saarland (1957–1959)	Currency of Germany; 1 July 1990 – 31 December 2001; Note: euro existed as money of account since 1 January 1999, with DM coins and banknotes being the German appearance of the euro	Succeeded by: Euro; Reason: deployment of euro cash Ratio: 1 euro = 1.95583 Deutsche Mark
Preceded by: Mark of the GDR; Reason: currency union (1 July 1990) preparing the German reunification (3 October 1990); Ratio: at par up to 4000 GDR marks 2 GDR marks = 1 DM above 4000 GDR marks		Currency of Germany; 1 July 1990 – 31 December 2001; Note: euro existed as money of account since 1 January 1999, with DM coins and banknotes being the German appearance of the euro	Succeeded by: Euro; Reason: deployment of euro cash Ratio: 1 euro = 1.95583 Deutsche Mark
Preceded by: Yugoslav new dinar Reason: political and economic reasons		Currency of Kosovo, Montenegro; 1999 – 31 December 2001	Succeeded by: Euro; Reason: deployment of euro cash Ratio: 1 euro = 1.95583 Deutsche Mark
