= Otmar Emminger =

German economist (1911–1986)

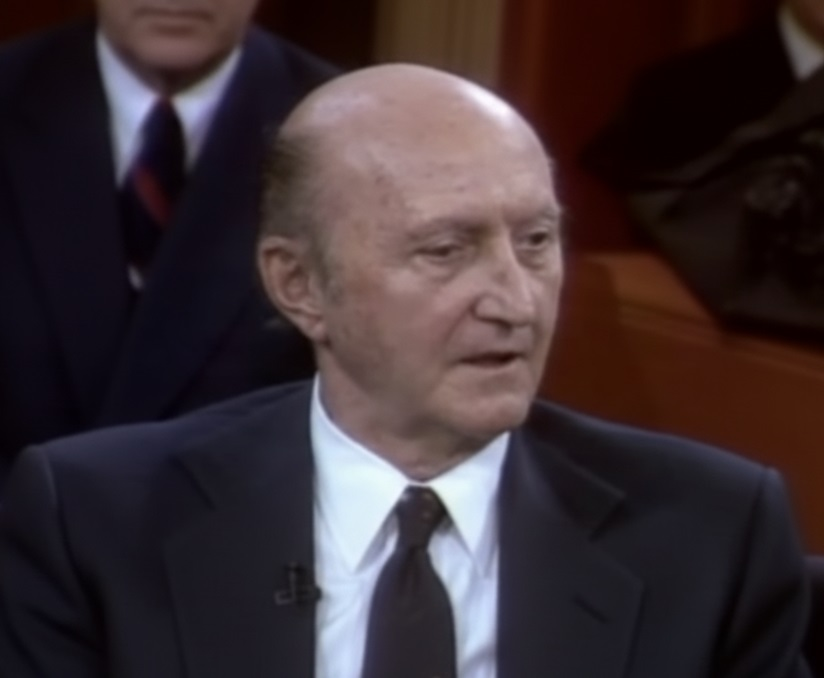
- Born: 2 March 1911; Augsburg
- Died: 3 August 1986 (aged 75); Manila
- Education: Ludwig-Maximilians-Universität München
- Occupation: Economist
- Years active: 1940s–1986

Otmar Emminger (2 March 1911 – 3 August 1986) was a German economist who served as the president of the Deutsche Bundesbank from 1977 to 1979.

== Early life and education ==
Emminger was born in Augsburg on 2 March 1911. In 1934, he received a PhD from the Ludwig-Maximilians-Universität München.

== Career and activities ==
Emminger was a lecturer at his alma mater. He began to work at the Deutsche Bundesbank in October 1950. From 1 April 1953 to 31 December 1969 he was a board member of the bank. In addition, he served as West Germany's executive director at the International Monetary Fund from 1953 to 1959. He was vice president of the bank from 1 January 1970 to 31 May 1977. He was appointed president of the bank on 1 June 1977, succeeding Karl Klasen in the post. Karl Otto Pöhl became his deputy. Emminger's term lasted until 31 December 1979, and he was replaced by Pöhl in the post.

In July 1986, Emminger began to serve as an advisor to the Philippines Government (Corazon Aquino had become president in February 1986) on behalf of West Germany. Emminger published his memoirs.

== Death ==
Emminger died of a heart attack in Manila, the Philippines, at the age of 74 in August 1986.

== Works ==
- Die englischen Währungsexperimente der Nachkriegszeit-Währungsentwertung und Krisenüberwindung Dissertation, Munich 1934 (in: Weltwirtschaftliches Archiv 40 (1934), pp. 270–325)
- Zwischenbilanz der DM-Aufwertung (1970)
- Inflation and the International Monetary System (1973)
- On the Way to a New International Monetary Order (1976)
- Verteidigung der DM. Plädoyers für stabiles Geld, Frankfurt am Main 1980
- (autobiography) D-Mark, Dollar, Währungskrisen. Erinnerungen eines ehemaligen Bundesbankpräsidenten, Deutsche Verlags-Anstalt, 1986, ISBN 3-421-06333-8.
