= Helmut Schlesinger =

German economist (1924–2024)

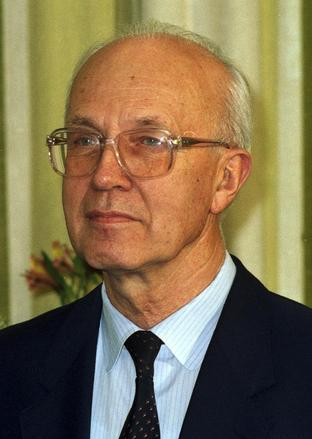
- Schlesinger in 1991

5th President of the German Bundesbank
- In office 1 August 1991 – 30 September 1993
- Preceded by: Karl Otto Pöhl
- Succeeded by: Hans Tietmeyer

Personal details
- Born: 4 September 1924 Penzberg, Bavaria, Germany
- Died: 23 December 2024 (aged 100) Bad Homburg, Hesse, Germany
- Spouse: Carola
- Children: 4
- Education: Ludwig-Maximilians-Universität München (Diplom, PhD)
- Occupation: Economist

Helmut Schlesinger (4 September 1924 – 23 December 2024) was a German economist and President of the Bundesbank from 1991 to 1993. Having worked for the institution and its precursor from 1952, he pursued monetary stability.

== Biography ==
=== Early life and education ===
Schlesinger was born in Penzberg, Bavaria, on 4 September 1924. His schooling was at Bavarian boarding schools until he joined the German military in 1943 and served for two years during World War II. He then studied economics at the Ludwig-Maximilians-Universität München, from which he graduated with a Diplom in 1948, and with a doctorate in economics in 1951. His thesis was about economic efficiency in the public administration sector.

=== Career ===
From 1949 to 1952, Schlesinger worked at the Ifo Institute for Economic Research in Munich. He entered the precursor of the Deutsche Bundesbank, the Bank deutscher Länder, in 1952 and ascended rapidly to the position of a department head. In 1956, he served as Head of the Economic Analysis and Forecasting Division. In 1964, he was appointed Head of the Economics and Statistics Department; he became a member of the executive board in 1972. He served as deputy chairman from 1980 to 1991 and as President of the German Central Bank from 1991 to 1993 when he retired, succeeding Karl Otto Pöhl and succeeded by Hans Tietmeyer. His key objective was the stability of the currency. His counter-inflation policies influenced European monetary politics. Remarks by Schlesinger in Handelsblatt in 1992 triggered a financial crisis for the British pound that became known as Black Wednesday.

Schlesinger was a distinguished honorary professor at the German University of Administrative Sciences. He was an advisor to IDEAglobal Group, a global financial research organisation.

=== Personal life ===
Schlesinger and his wife Carola had four children. He turned 100 on 4 September 2024, and died in Bad Homburg three months later, on 23 December.

== Awards ==
Schlesinger was a member of the Orders of Merit and of Chivalry of Germany, Italy, Austria, Hungary, Sweden, and Luxembourg. He received honorary doctorates from the Goethe University Frankfurt (1981), the University of Göttingen (1981), and the University of St. Gallen (1993).
