= Jens Weidmann =

German economist (born 1968)

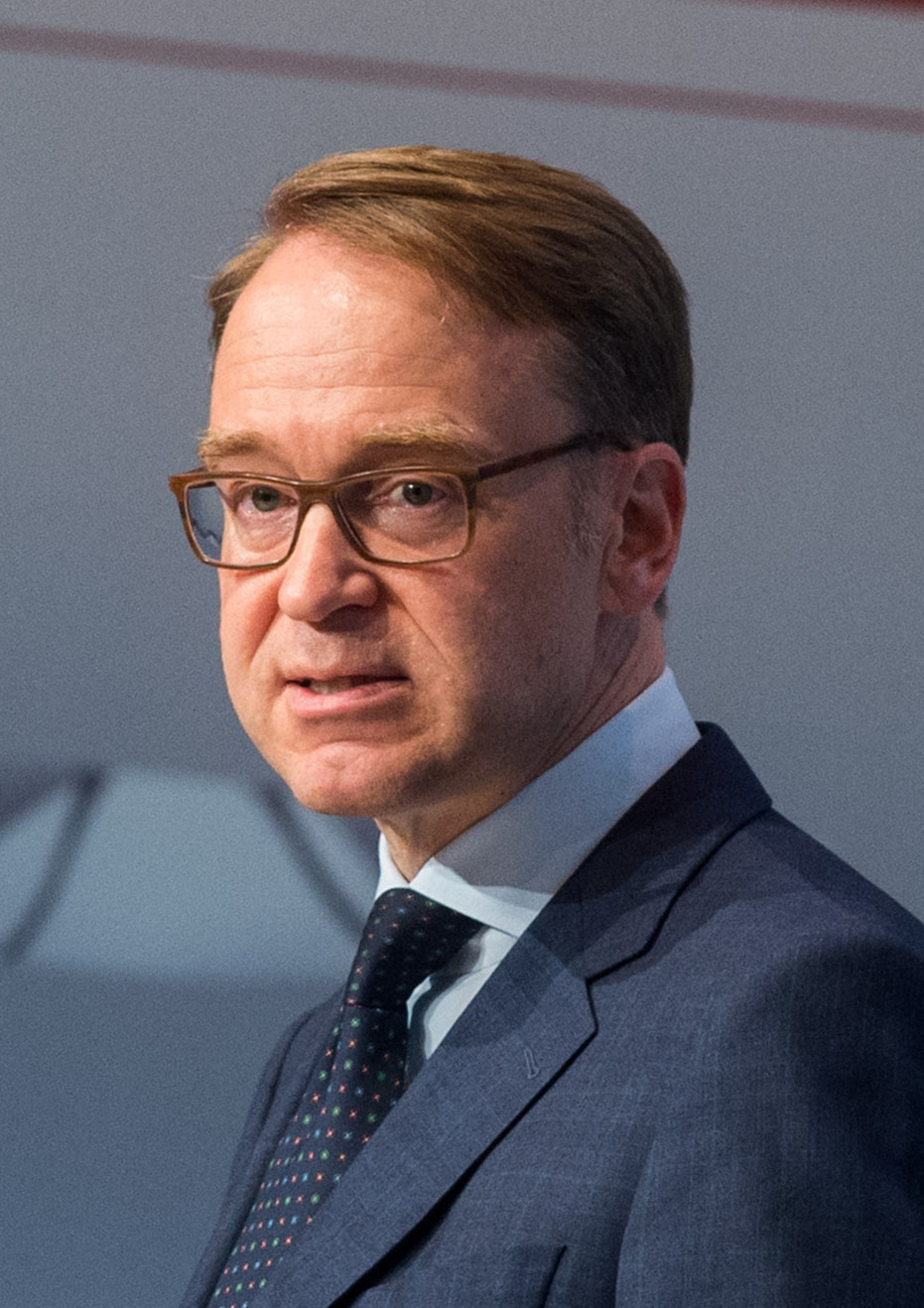

Chair of the Bank for International Settlements
- In office 1 November 2015 – 31 December 2021
- General Manager: Jaime Caruana; Agustín Carstens
- Preceded by: Christian Noyer
- Succeeded by: François Villeroy de Galhau

9th President of the German Bundesbank
- In office 1 May 2011 – 31 December 2021
- Appointed by: Christian Wulff
- Preceded by: Axel A. Weber
- Succeeded by: Joachim Nagel

Personal details
- Born: 20 April 1968 (age 58) Solingen, West Germany (now Germany)
- Education: Aix-Marseille University; University of Paris; University of Bonn

Jens Weidmann (born 20 April 1968) is a German economist who served as president of the Deutsche Bundesbank between 2011 and 2021. He also served as chairman of the Board of the Bank for International Settlements (BIS).

Before moving to the Bundesbank, Weidmann served as Head of Division IV (Economic and Financial Policy) in the Federal Chancellery from February 2006. He was the chief negotiator of the Federal Republic of Germany for both the summits of the G8 and the G20.

== Early life and academic career ==
Weidmann was born in Solingen. In 1987, Weidmann graduated from gymnasium in Backnang, Baden-Württemberg after which he studied economics at Aix-Marseille University, the University of Paris, and University of Bonn. He received his Diplom in economics in 1993. From 1993 to 1994, he commenced his doctoral studies on European monetary policy under the supervision of professor Roland Vaubel at the University of Mannheim, but later transferred back to Bonn again. He received his Dr. rer. nat. pol. under the auspices of monetary theorist Manfred J. M. Neumann in 1997. During his studies Weidmann had internships at the Banque de France and the National Bank of Rwanda. Due to the resulting knowledge of the French financing sector his later career in German financial politics was welcomed in France and seen as a support of the Franco-German twin engine. His education has been characterized as specialising in monetarist economics.

== Professional career ==
From 1997 to 1999, Weidmann worked at the International Monetary Fund. Until 2004 he worked as Secretary of the German Council of Economic Experts. During his time at the council, he played a key role in compiling a 20-point plan for boosting growth and employment that formed the basis of then-Chancellor Gerhard Schröder's Agenda 2010 reforms.

From there he moved to the Bundesbank, where until 2006, he was the head of the Monetary Policy and Monetary Analysis group.

=== Advisor to Chancellor Angela Merkel, 2006–2011 ===
In 2006, Weidmann began working at the Federal Chancellery, where he was responsible for preparing the content and strategy of the G-20 round which was formed to counter the effects of the financial crisis. When he started, he was the youngest department head in the German government. Chancellor Angela Merkel promoted him in December 2009 to the influential role of the Sherpa of the G8 summits as she considers the G8 round to be only a pre-summit of the G20 round in the field of the world-wide financial system as well as that most other subjects need a wider context than the G8 as well (compare Heiligendamm Process for G8+5).

During his time at the Federal Chancellery, Weidmann was involved in a series of major decisions in response to the financial crisis in Germany and Europe: preventing the meltdown of the bank Hypo Real Estate, guaranteeing German deposits and implementing a rescue programme for the banking system, piecing together two fiscal-stimulus programmes, and setting up the Greek bail-out package and the European Financial Stability Facility (EFSF).

In 2011, Weidmann suggested to Merkel that the position of Bundesbank vice president, which had also become vacant, be filled by Sabine Lautenschläger, then director of Germany's Federal Financial Supervisory Authority (BaFin).

=== President of the Bundesbank, 2011–2021 ===
In February 2011, Weidmann was designated to succeed Axel A. Weber as president of the Deutsche Bundesbank. In September, with the ongoing European sovereign debt crisis, Weidmann was observed by a British commentator, David Marsh, to be taking a "cool" course relative to Chancellor Merkel. Marsh wrote that Weidmann was saying the European Monetary Union (EMU) "has to go in one of two directions. Either it takes the path of a fiscal union in which member countries fuse together their economic and financial systems into a much more robust framework that will protect them from internal dislocation. Weidmann says, coolly, this is somewhat unlikely. Or EMU remains a looser grouping of countries that will face the discipline of the financial markets if they fail to produce economic convergence," namely exit from the EMU and default, looking particularly at Greece. Marsh also noted that Merkel is committed to the first course and so may come into conflict with her one-time economic adviser Weidmann.

In a late November 2011, speech in Berlin, Weidmann criticized the errors and "many years of wrong developments" of the EMU's peripheral states, particularly the wasted opportunity represented by their "disproportionate investment in private homebuilding, high government spending or private consumption", David Marsh reported. In early December, with another in a string of Eurozone summits imminent, Bloomberg commented that the new ECB head Mario Draghi "knows he can't afford to repeat" his predecessor Jean-Claude Trichet's mistake of alienating the Bundesbank. Draghi was said in the report to be courting Weidmann by, among others, Julian Callow, chief European economist at Barclays in London.

In May 2012, Weidmann's stance was characterized by US economist and columnist Paul Krugman as amounting to wanting to destroy the Euro.

Weidmann, in late August 2012, was reported to have threatened to resign as Draghi's July 2012 promise to do "whatever it takes" to save the Euro seemed likely to lead to purchases of Italian and Spanish bonds to keep interest rates in those major member economies capped at manageable levels. "In an interview with Der Spiegel last week, Weidmann said the bond buying made it look as if ECB was financing governments directly — and shouldn't go ahead", reported another MarketWatch commentator, Matthew Lynn. Lynn further speculated on the Draghi-Weidmann interaction, reminding readers of Axel Weber's 2011 resignation over a "similar [ECB] scheme" and also of the 1992 failure of the European Exchange Rate Mechanism over German refusal to choose "printing money (taking some small risks with inflation) ... to stabilize the system".

On 24 February 2016, as part of the Bundesbank's annual news conference, Weidmann notably dismissed deflation in light of the ECB's current stimulus program, pointing out the healthy condition of the German economy and that the euro area is not that bad off, on the eve of the 9–10 March 2016 meetings.

In April 2019, Weidmann's mandate as Bundesbank president was renewed for another eight years. On 31 December 2021, he stepped down, concluding his ten-year tenure five years early.

== Later career ==
In early 2022, the International Monetary Fund appointed Weidmann to lead a new external panel to strengthen institutional safeguards in the wake of a data scandal involving IMF Managing Director Kristalina Georgieva during her time at the World Bank.

== Other activities ==
=== International organizations ===
- International Monetary Fund (IMF), ex-officio Member of the Board of Governors (2011–2021)
- Bank of International Settlements, ex-officio Member of the Board of Directors (2011–2021)
- Financial Stability Board, ex-officio Member (2011–2021)

=== Corporate boards ===
- Munich Re, Member of the supervisory board (since 2024)
- Commerzbank, chairman of the supervisory board (since 2023)
- Fraport, Member of the Economic Advisory Board

=== Non-profit organizations ===
- Dieter Schwarz Stiftung, Member of the Board of Trustees (since 2023)
- Kühne-Stiftung, Member of the Board of Trustees (2023–2025)
- Fazit-Stiftung, Member of the Board of Trustees (since 2022)
- Deutsche Nationalstiftung,
- Frankfurt School of Finance & Management Foundation, Member of the Board of Trustees
- House of Finance, Goethe University Frankfurt, Member of the Board of Trustees
- Stifterverband für die Deutsche Wissenschaft, Member of the Board of Trustees
- Deutsches Aktieninstitut, ex officio Member of the Board of Governors
- Frankfurter Gesellschaft für Handel, Industrie und Wissenschaft, Member
- Stiftung Marktwirtschaft, Member of the Board of Trustees
- Verein für Socialpolitik, Member of the advisory council
- Peace of Westphalia Prize, Member of the Jury

== Recognition (selection) ==
- 2016 – Medal for Extraordinary Merits for Bavaria in a United Europe
- 2015 – International Prize, Friedrich August von Hayek Foundation
- 2014 – Wolfram Engels Award, Stiftung Marktwirtschaft
- 2013 – Honorary degree, HEC Paris

== Selected publications ==
- Leite, Carlos A.; ——— (1999). "Does Mother Nature Corrupt? Natural Resources, Corruption, and Economic Growth". IMF Working Papers. 99 (85): 1. doi:10.5089/9781451850734.001. SSRN 259928.
- Neumann, Manfred J. M.; ——— (1998). "The Information Content of German Discount Rate Changes". European Economic Review. 42 (9): 1667–1682. CiteSeerX 10.1.1.203.5796. doi:10.1016/S0014-2921(97)00110-4.
- ——— (1996). "New Hope for the Fisher Effect?: A Reexamination Using Threshold Cointegration". SFB 303 Discussion Paper B-385. SSRN 3555.
- Henry, Jérôme; ——— (1995). "Asymmetry in the EMS Revisited: Evidence from the Causality Analysis of Daily Eurorates". Annales d'Économie et de Statistique. 40 (40): 125–160. doi:10.2307/20076018. JSTOR 20076018.
