= Sabine Mauderer =

German banker (born 1970)

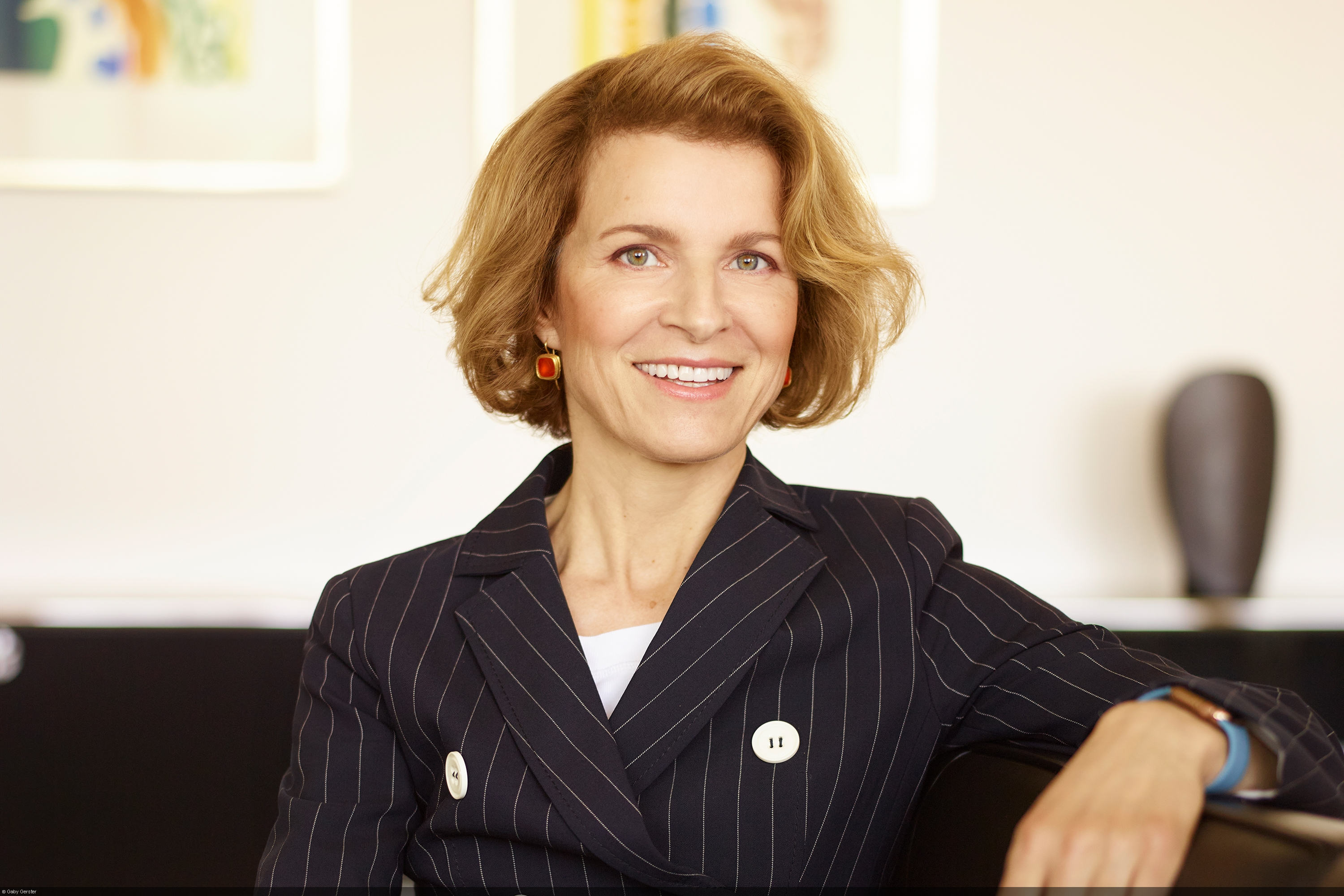
Sabine Mauderer – Member of the Executive Board of the Deutsche Bundesbank

Sabine Mauderer is a German lawyer who has been serving as a member of the executive board of Deutsche Bundesbank since 2018.

Mauderer is known for her work in encouraging banks to consider the impact of climate change on banks. Prior to joining Bundesbank, she held leadership roles at the KfW Banking Group.

== Early life and education ==
Mauderer was born in Schleswig-Holstein in 1970. She studied Law at Osnabrueck University and the University of Seville, graduating in 1998. In 2000, she earned a PhD in Law from Osnabrueck University. In 2009, she also obtained an Executive MBA from ESSEC Business School and Mannheim Business School.

== Career ==
From 2003 until 2006, Mauderer worked at the German Federal Ministry of Finance on financial markets. From 2004 to 2005, she was seconded to the German Embassy in Washington, D.C.

In 2006, Mauderer joined the KfW Banking Group where she held several senior positions.

=== Bundesbank, 2018–present ===
In 2018, Mauderer was appointed to the Executive Board of the Deutsche Bundesbank. In January 2022, she was appointed Vice-Chair of the Network for Greening the Financial System.

== Work ==
Mauderer is responsible for the implementation of the European Central Bank's monetary policy in Germany by Deutsche Bundesbank. She believes that capital markets play an important role in financing the sustainable and digital transformation of the economy in Germany and Europe. Mauderer has argued that public-private partnerships can be a feasible way to mobilise funds for the transition. Mauderer has also made the case for more openness of businesses in Germany and supports a European capital markets union. Mauderer has also argued that central banks need to address climate change because it poses risks to financial stability, and she sees central banks as catalysts to make the financial system greener. Mauderer oversaw several reports of the Network for Greening the Financial System that mapped out options for central banks to adjust their monetary policy to tackle climate change.

== Other activities ==
- German Federal Environmental Foundation (DBU), Member of the Board of Trustees (since 2024)
- European Investment Bank (EIB), Member of the Appointment Advisory Committee (since 2022)
