= List of commemorative coins of Germany =

This is a list of commemorative coins issued by the Federal Republic of Germany. For regular coins, see Deutsche Mark and German euro coins. Those prior to 2002 were denominated in Deutsche Marks; subsequent ones have been denominated in euros.

== 1950s and 1960s ==
- 100th anniversary of the Germanisches Nationalmuseum in Nuremberg. 5 DM, silver, 1952.
- 150th death anniversary of Friedrich von Schiller. 5 DM, silver, 1955.
- 300th birthday of Margrave Ludwig Wilhelm of Baden. 5 DM, silver, 1955.
- 100th death anniversary of Joseph von Eichendorff. 5 DM, silver, 1957.
- 150th death anniversary of Johann Gottlieb Fichte. 5 DM, silver, 1964.
- 250th death anniversary of Gottfried Wilhelm Leibniz. 5 DM, silver, 1966.
- 200th birthday of Wilhelm and Alexander von Humboldt. 5 DM, silver, 1967.
- 150th birthday of Friedrich Wilhelm Raiffeisen. 5 DM, silver, 1968.
- 500th death anniversary of Johannes Gutenberg. 5 DM, silver, 1968.
- 150th birthday of Max von Pettenkofer. 5 DM, silver, 1968.
- 150th birthday of Theodor Fontane. 5 DM, silver, 1969.
- 375th death anniversary of Gerhard Mercator. 5 DM, silver, 1969.

== 1970s ==
- 200th birthday of Ludwig van Beethoven. 5 DM, silver, 1970.
- 100th anniversary of the foundation of the German Empire. 5 DM, silver, 1971.
- 500th birthday of Albrecht Dürer. 5 DM, silver, 1971.
- 1972 Summer Olympics in Munich. 10 DM, silver, 1972. Six different motives: Athletes; Flame; In Deutschland; In München; Schleife; Stadium
- 500th birthday of Nicolaus Copernicus. 5 DM, silver, 1973.
- 125th anniversary of the Frankfurt National Assembly. 5 DM, silver, 1973.
- 25th anniversary of the adoption of the Basic Law. 5 DM, silver, 1974
- 250th birthday of Immanuel Kant. 5 DM, silver, 1974.
- 50th death anniversary of Friedrich Ebert. 5 DM, silver, 1975.
- 100th birthday of Albert Schweitzer. 5 DM, silver, 1975.
- European Year of Monument Protection. 5 DM, silver, 1975.
- 300th death anniversary of Hans Jacob Christoph von Grimmelshausen. 5 DM, silver, 1976.
- 200th birthday of Carl Friedrich Gauss. 5 DM, silver, 1977.
- 200th birthday of Heinrich von Kleist. 5 DM, silver, 1977.
- 100th birthday of Gustav Stresemann. 5 DM, silver, 1978.
- 225th death anniversary of Balthasar Neumann. 5 DM, silver, 1978.
- 150th anniversary of the German Archaeological Institute. 5 DM, silver, 1979.
- 100th birthday of Otto Hahn. 5 DM, copper-nickel, 1979.

== 1980s ==
- 750th death anniversary of Walther von der Vogelweide. 5 DM, copper-nickel, 1980.
- 100th anniversary of the completion of Cologne Cathedral. 5 DM, copper-nickel, 1980.
- 200th death anniversary of Gotthold Ephraim Lessing. 5 DM, copper-nickel, 1981.
- 150th death anniversary of Carl vom Stein. 5 DM, copper-nickel, 1981.
- 10th anniversary of the UN Environmental Conference. 5 DM, copper-nickel, 1982.
- 150th death anniversary of Johann Wolfgang von Goethe. 5 DM, copper-nickel, 1982.
- 100th death anniversary of Karl Marx. 5 DM, copper-nickel, 1983.
- 500th birthday of Martin Luther. 5 DM, copper-nickel, 1983.
- 150th anniversary of the German Customs Union. 5 DM, copper-nickel, 1984.
- 175th birthday of Felix Mendelssohn Bartholdy. 5 DM, copper-nickel, 1984.
- European Year of Music. 5 DM, copper-nickel, 1985.
- 150th anniversary of German railroads. 5 DM, copper-nickel, 1985.
- 600th anniversary of the University of Heidelberg. 5 DM, copper-nickel, 1986.
- 200th death anniversary of Frederick the Great. 5 DM, copper-nickel, 1986.
- 750th anniversary of Berlin. 10 DM, silver, 1987.
- 30th anniversary of the Treaty of Rome. 10 DM, silver, 1987.
- 200th birthday of Arthur Schopenhauer. 10 DM, silver, 1988.
- 100th death anniversary of Carl Zeiss. 10 DM, silver, 1988.
- 40th anniversary of the Federal Republic of Germany. 10 DM, silver, 1989.
- 2,000th anniversary of Bonn. 10 DM, silver, 1989.
- 800th anniversary of the port of Hamburg. 10 DM, silver, 1989.

== 1990s ==
- 800th death anniversary of Barbarossa. 10 DM, silver, 1990.
- 800th anniversary of the Teutonic Order. 10 DM, silver, 1990.
- 200th anniversary of the Brandenburg Gate. 10 DM, silver, 1991.
- 125th birthday of Käthe Kollwitz. 10 DM, silver, 1992.
- 150th anniversary of the order Pour le Mérite ("Blue Max"). 10 DM, silver, 1992.
- 1,000th anniversary of Potsdam. 10 DM, silver, 1993.
- 150th birthday of Robert Koch. 10 DM, silver, 1993.
- 50th anniversary of the 20 July Plot to assassinate Hitler. 10 DM, silver, 1994.
- 250th birthday of Johann Gottfried Herder. 10 DM, silver, 1994.
- Reconstruction of the Frauenkirche in Dresden. 10 DM, silver, 1995.
- 150th birthday of Wilhelm Conrad Röntgen and 100th anniversary of discovery of X-rays. 10 DM, silver, 1995.
- 800th death anniversary of Heinrich der Löwe. 10 DM, silver, 1995.
- 150th anniversary of the Kolpingwerk. 10 DM, silver, 1996.
- 500th birthday of Philipp Melanchthon. 10 DM, silver, 1997.
- 100th anniversary of the Diesel engine. 10 DM, silver, 1997.
- 200th birthday of Heinrich Heine. 10 DM, silver, 1997.
- 350th anniversary of the Peace of Westphalia. 10 DM, silver, 1998.
- 900th birthday of Hildegard von Bingen. 10 DM, silver, 1998.
- 50th anniversary of the Deutsche Mark. 10 DM, silver, 1998.
- 50th anniversary of the Deutsche Mark. 1 DM, gold, 1999.
- 300th anniversary of the Stift in Halle. 10 DM, silver, 1998.
- 50th anniversary of the Basic Law. 10 DM, silver, 1999.
- 50th anniversary of the SOS Children's Villages. 10 DM, silver, 1999.
- Weimar, European City of Culture, and 250th birthday of Johann Wolfgang von Goethe. 10 DM, silver, 1999.

== 2000s: Marks ==
- Expo 2000. 10 DM, silver, 2000.
- 1,200th anniversary of Charlemagne and the Aachen Cathedral. 10 DM, silver, 2000.
- 250th death anniversary of Johann Sebastian Bach. 10 DM, silver, 2000.
- 10th anniversary of German reunification. 10 DM, silver, 2000.
- 200th birthday of Albert Lortzing. 10 DM, silver, 2001.
- 50th anniversary of the Federal Constitutional Court. 10 DM, silver, 2001.
- 750th anniversary of the Katharinenkloster and 50th anniversary of the Sea Museum in Stralsund. 10 DM, silver, 2001.
