= Deutsche Bundesbank =

Central bank of Germany

Coordinates: 50°08′02″N 08°39′35″E

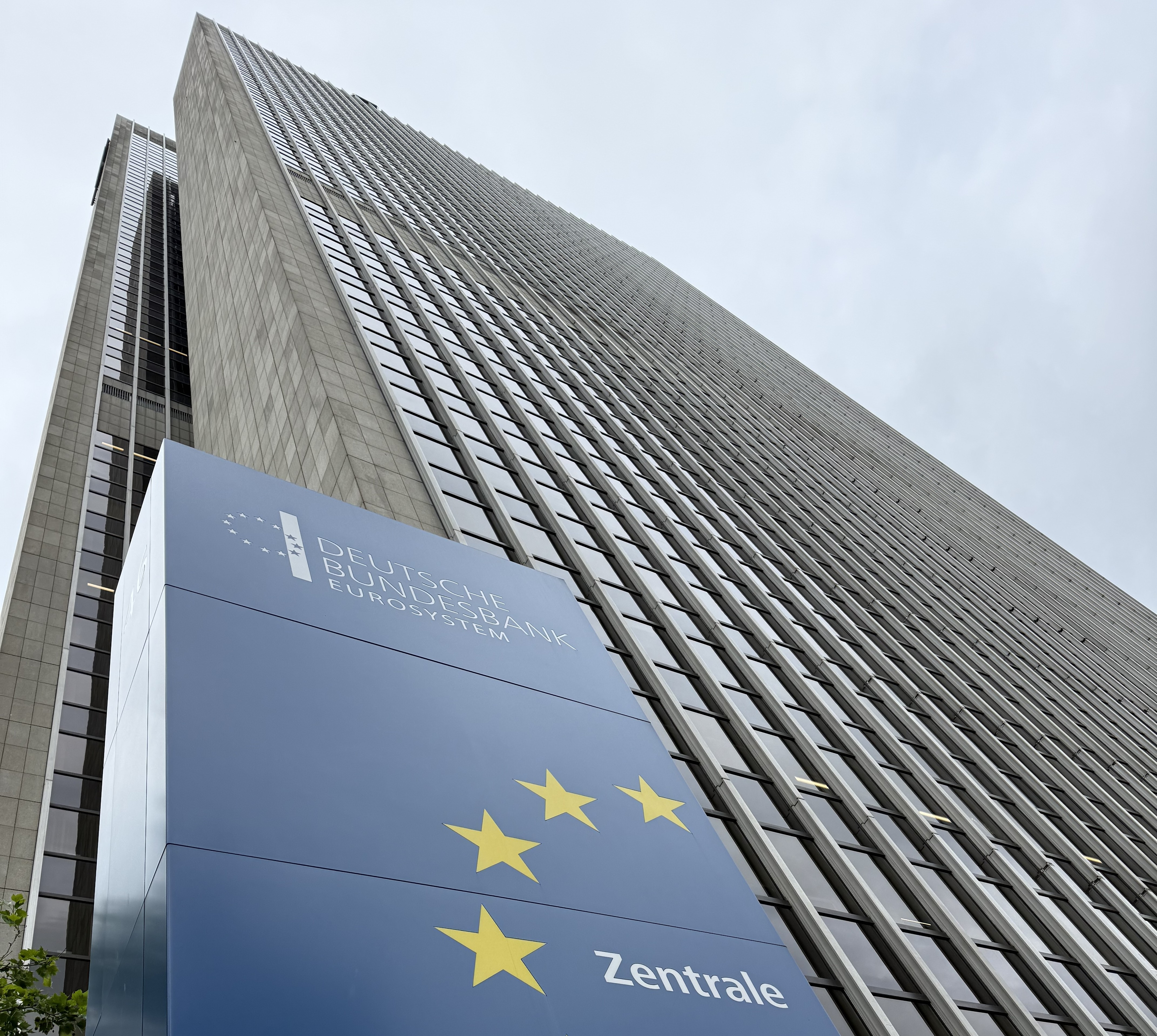
- Temporary seat of the Bundesbank in the Frankfurter Büro Center
- Central bank of: Germany (1990–present); West Germany (1957–1990)
- Headquarters: Frankfurt, Hesse, Germany
- Established: 1957
- President: Joachim Nagel
- Currency: Deutsche Mark (1957–2002)
- Reserves: €219,86 billion (2021)
- Preceded by: Bank deutscher Länder (West Germany, 1948–1957); Deutsche Notenbank (East Germany, 1948–1968); Staatsbank der DDR (East Germany, 1968–1990)
- Succeeded by: European Central Bank (1999)^{fn}
- Website: bundesbank.de/en
- ^{fn} The Bundesbank still exists but many functions have been taken over by the ECB.

The Deutsche Bundesbank (pronounced [ˈdɔʏtʃə ˈbʊndəsˌbaŋk], lit. 'German Federal Bank', colloquially Buba, sometimes alternatively abbreviated as BBk or DBB) is the national central bank for Germany within the Eurosystem. It was the German central bank from 1957 to 1998, issuing the Deutsche Mark (DM). It succeeded the Bank deutscher Länder, which had introduced the DM on 20 June 1948.

The Bundesbank was the first central bank to be given full independence, leading this form of central bank to be referred to as the "Bundesbank model", as opposed, for instance, to the "New Zealand model", which has a goal (i.e. inflation target) set by the government. The Bundesbank was greatly respected for its control of inflation through the second half of the 20th century. This made the German Mark one of the most respected currencies, and the Bundesbank gained substantial indirect influence in many European countries. As of 2023, its balance sheet total was €2.516 trillion, making it the 4th largest central bank in the world.

The Bundesbank is not itself a financial supervisory authority, but participates in European banking supervision as a member of the Supervisory Board of the European Central Bank, alongside the Federal Financial Supervisory Authority. It is also a member of the European Systemic Risk Board (ESRB).

== History ==
=== Background (1948–1957) ===
The history of the Bundesbank is inextricably linked with the history of the German currency after the Second World War. Following the total destruction after the war, the old Reichsmark was practically worthless, and a currency reform was implemented in the western occupation zones including West Berlin: on 21 June 1948, the D-Mark, or Deutsche Mark, replaced the Reichsmark. The currency reform was based on laws enacted by the Allied military government. In preparation, the Western Powers established a new two-tier central bank system in the occupied zones; in its federal structure, it was modeled on the Federal Reserve System of the US. It comprised the central banks of the states (Länder) of the West German occupation zones and the Bank deutscher Länder in Frankfurt am Main, which was created on 1 March 1948. The central banks of the Länder acted as central banks within their areas of jurisdiction. The Bank deutscher Länder, whose share capital was held by the central banks of the Länder, was responsible for issuing bank notes, co-ordinating policy and various central tasks including management of foreign exchange. The supreme governing body of the two-tier central bank system was the Central Bank Council (Zentralbankrat) set up at the Bank deutscher Länder. It consisted of a president, the presidents of the central banks of the Länder and the president of the directorate (board) of the Bank deutscher Länder. Amongst other things, the Central Bank Council determined policy on bank rate and minimum reserve policy, open-market policy guidelines and granting of credit. After the negative experience with a central bank subject to government orders, the principle of an independent central bank was established. The Bank deutscher Länder was independent of German political bodies from the start, including the federal German government, which was active from September 1949. It achieved independence from the Allies in 1951.

=== 1957–1990 ===
The German "Basic Law" (constitution), which had come into force on 23 May 1949, placed an obligation on the German federal legislature to establish a federal bank responsible for the issue of bank notes and currency. The legislature fulfilled this obligation by passing the Bundesbank Act (BBankG) of 26 July 1957, which abolished the two-tier structure of the central bank system. The central banks of the Länder were now no longer independent note-issuing banks, but became regional headquarters of the Bundesbank, nevertheless retaining the title "state central bank" (Landeszentralbank).

The Central Bank Council remained the supreme decision-making body of the Bundesbank. It was now made up of the presidents of the central banks of the Länder and a board of directors based in Frankfurt. The Central Bank Council decided on the currency and credit policy and laid down rules for management. As the central executive body of the Bundesbank, the Directorate (Direktorium) was responsible for implementing the decisions of the Central Bank Council. The Directorate ran the bank and was, in particular, responsible for dealings with the federal government and its "special assets" (Sondervermögen), for transactions with credit institutes operating in the Federal republic of Germany, for currency transactions, and foreign commercial transactions, and for open-market dealings. The Directorate was made up of the president and the vice-president of the Bundesbank and up to six additional members.

The central banks of the Länder carried out business falling in their areas independently. The Bundesbank Act explicitly made them responsible for dealings with public bodies and credit institutes. The central Banks of the Länder also controlled the subsidiary bodies (Zweiganstalten), now called branches (Filialen). Overall management of each Land central bank was in the hands of its executive board (Vorstand), which as a rule consisted of the president and the vice-president of the bank.

=== 1990–1993 ===
In the wake of the Fall of the Berlin Wall, the Federal Republic of Germany and the German Democratic Republic signed a treaty on 18 May 1990, that created an economic, social and currency union between the two German states; it came into force on 1 July 1990, and made the Deutsche Mark the sole legal tender in both German states. The Bundesbank was made responsible for money and currency policy within the whole of the currency union. A "Provisional Administration Body" was set up for the purpose of implementing the treaty, and this body continued to operate beyond the official date of reunification until 31 October 1990. The Bundesbank Act was amended to adjust the organizational structure of the Bundesbank to better match changed circumstances following German reunification, and at the same time streamline the organisation. The eleven central banks of the Länder and the Provisional Administrative Body were replaced by nine central banks of similar economic size.

=== 1993–2001 ===
The Maastricht Treaty that came into force on 1 November 1993 laid the foundation for the European Economic and Currency Union (EECU). National responsibility for monetary policy was transferred, at the Community level, to the European System of Central Banks (ESCB), comprising the European Central bank (ECB) and the national central banks (NCBs) of the EU states. Until the ECB became fully responsible for currency in 2001, the Bundesbank had three governing bodies. The Central Bank Council (Zentralbankrat) was the supreme body of the Bundesbank. It was made up of:

1. the Directorate, which comprised the president, the vice-president and six additional members. These eight people were nominated by the Federal Government (Bundesregierung)
2. The nine presidents of the Landeszentralbanken. These were nominated by the Bundesrat.

The Directorate was the executive body of the Bundesbank, while all currency policy decisions were made by the Central Bank Council.

=== 2001–present ===
In 2001 the ECB took over full control of currency. The Bundesbank Act was last amended in 2002 by the 7th Law Amending the Law on the Bundesbank of 30 April 2002, which gave the Bundesbank its current structure.

== The Bundesbank today ==
After the ECB took over responsibility for currency, the Bundesbank continued to exist. Its duties were redefined by the 7th Law amending the "Law on the German Bundesbank" of 30 April 2002, in Section 3 of the Bundesbank Act:

The Bundesbank, being the central bank of the Federal Republic of Germany, is an integral part of the European System of Central Banks (ESCB). It shall participate in the performance of the ESCB's tasks with the primary objective of maintaining price stability, and shall arrange for the execution of domestic and international payments. In addition, it shall discharge the duties assigned to it under this Act or other legislation.

Unlike other central banks such as the Bank of England and the U.S. Federal Reserve (but like the ECB), the Bundesbank is not officially responsible for maintaining the stability of the financial system and is not a lender of last resort. For 2022, the Bundesbank recorded its first loss since 1979.

Based on the Bundesbank Act and the ECB Statute, the Bundesbank has four areas of activity, which it mostly handles jointly with the ECB:

=== The Bundesbank as a note-issuing bank ===
As a note-issuing bank, the Bundesbank provides the economy with cash, and ensures the physical circulation of cash. It checks the cash delivered by banks and money transport companies, removes counterfeit money from circulation and hands it to the police. It changes D-Mark holdings still in circulation, without any time limit and replaces damaged or mutilated notes (National Analysis Centre for Counterfeit and Damaged Banknotes and Coins). It also issues information on the safety mechanisms for notes and coins and issues a weekly bulletin on the volume of cash in circulation.

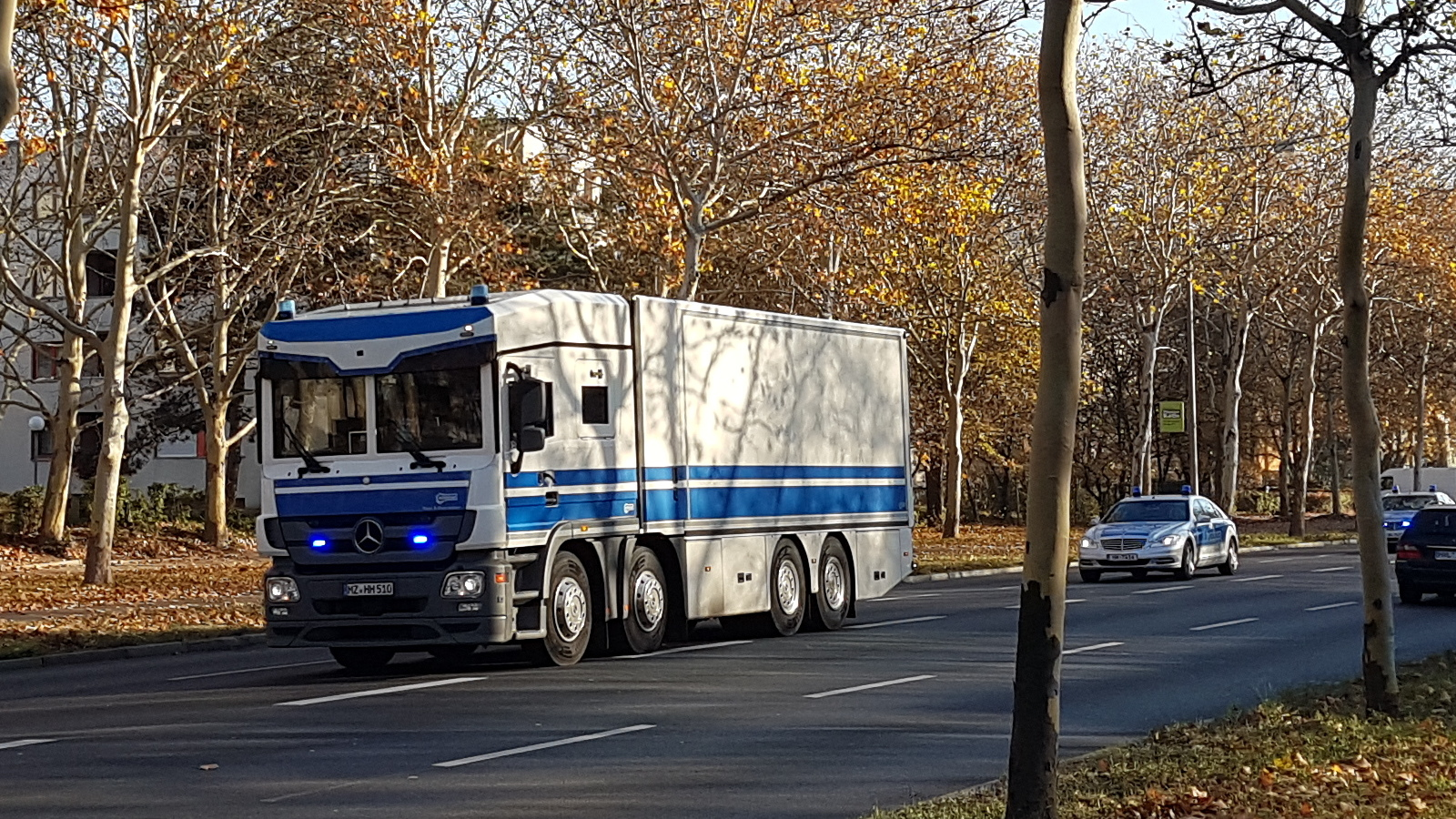
Public money transfer of the Deutsche Bundesbank with an armored Mercedes-Benz Actros and Mercedes W221 S-Guard support vehicles

=== The Bundesbank as the banks' banker ===
In relation to the commercial banking system, the Bundesbank has two functions:

==== Clearing house for commercial banks ====
Firstly, the Bundesbank is a refinancing source and clearing house for the commercial banks. The commercial banks can use what are known as "refinancing instruments" to cover their needs for central bank money through the Bundesbank and the ECB. Until the end of 1998, the control of the money supply by this method was one of the main tasks of the Bundesbank. Since 1 January 1999, one of the principal aims of the ECB has been to maintain price stability by means of its monetary strategy. Commercial banks can deposit money that is temporarily surplus to requirements with the Bundesbank/ECB (known as a deposit facility). The Bundesbank supports cross-border payments between domestic and foreign commercial banks, for instance by means of the German real time gross transfer system RTGSplus and, since 2007, through its participation in the Eurosystem's TARGET Services.

==== Bank supervision ====
The bank also helps to regulate commercial banks, in close cooperation with the German financial regulatory agency the Bundesanstalt für Finanzdienstleistungsaufsicht (BaFin).

=== The Bundesbank as the state's banker ===
As the state's banker, the Bundesbank provides accounts and performs normal banking services for federal, state (Land) and local authorities, as well as for the statutory social security organizations. All such accounts are required to have a positive balance, i.e. the Bundesbank is not allowed to grant credits to the public sector. This is due to negative historical precedents in connection with the financing of two world wars by the Deutsche Reichsbank. It also carries out securities transactions for the federal government (Bundesfinanzagentur).

=== The Bundesbank as the keeper of the currency reserves ===
Currency reserves are all assets of the Bundesbank that are not specified in EUR, including gold reserves, securities in foreign currency, credit with foreign banks, foreign exchange, etc. Currency reserves can be invested for profit and also provide a possibility of intervening in the market if the exchange rate fluctuates strongly. The gold reserves of the Bundesbank are the second largest in the world (after the U.S. Federal Reserve). As of late 2021, the Bundesbank has over 3,359 tonnes of gold reserves.

==== Structure ====
Map of the regional headquarters of the Bundesbank

The Bundesbank has nine regional headquarters in the Länder, the former central banks of the Länder and 31 branches (Filiale). As of 30 June 2006, the Bundesbank had a total of 12,474 employees. These are available to banks, public authorities and money transport enterprises for the provision of cash and the clearing of credit transfer. The nine regional headquarters are:

- Frankfurt – federal headquarters, also governing the state of Hesse.
- Stuttgart, governing the state of Baden-Württemberg
- Munich, governing the state of Bavaria
- Berlin, governing federal city Berlin and the state of Brandenburg
- Hanover, governing the states of Bremen, Lower Saxony and Saxony-Anhalt
- Hamburg, governing the states of Hamburg, Mecklenburg-Vorpommern and Schleswig-Holstein
- Düsseldorf, governing the state of North Rhine-Westphalia
- Mainz, governing the states of Rhineland-Palatinate and Saarland
- Leipzig, governing the states of Saxony and Thuringia

==== Governance ====
The executive board (Vorstand) is the supreme governing body of the Bundesbank. It comprises: the president, the vice president and one additional board member, nominated by the German government, plus three additional members of the executive board, nominated by the Bundesrat. All members of the executive board are appointed by the President of Germany, normally for eight years, but at least for five years.

== Buildings ==
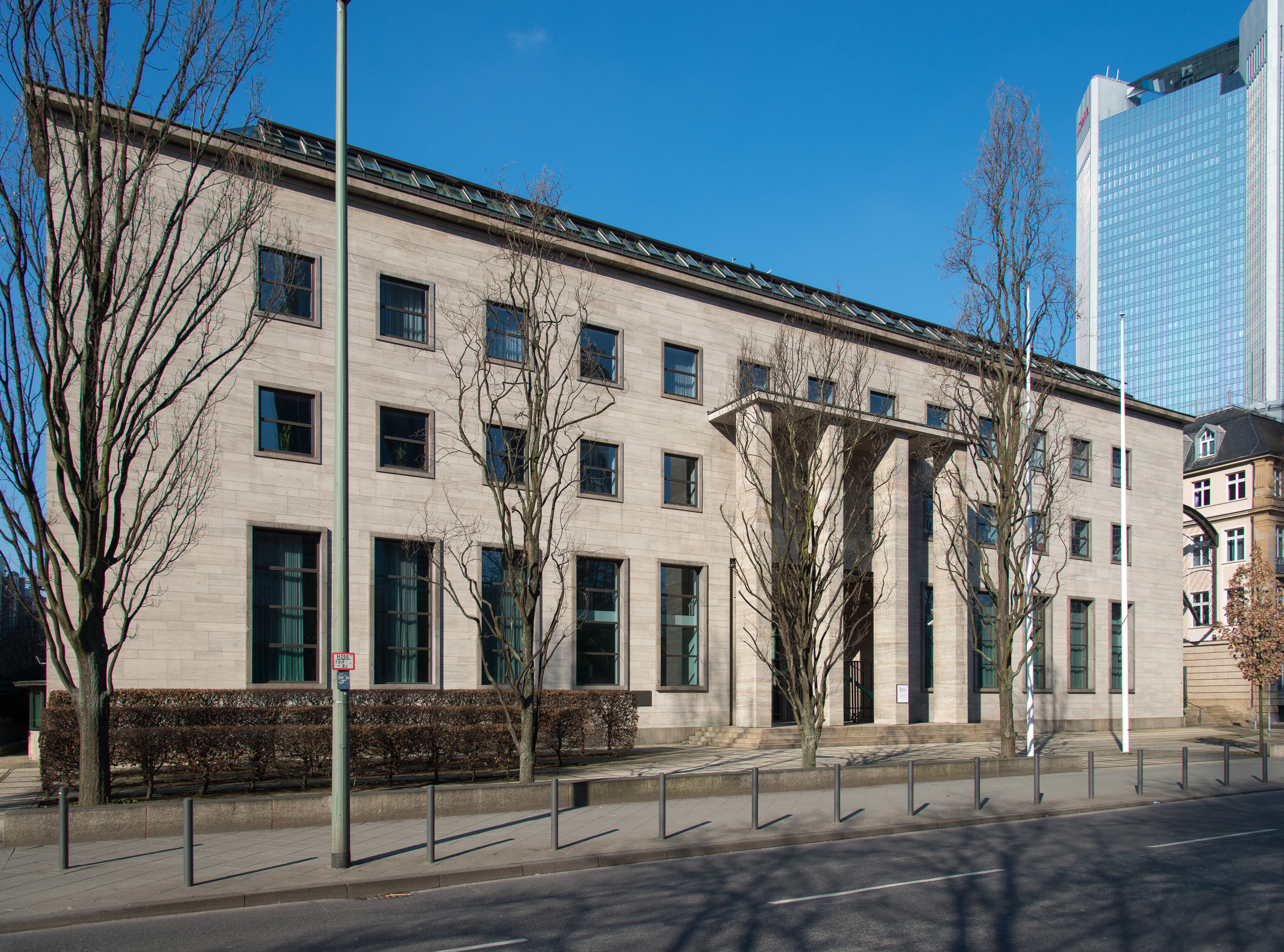
Former Frankfurt branch of the Reichsbank, seat of the Bundesbank from 1958 to 1972

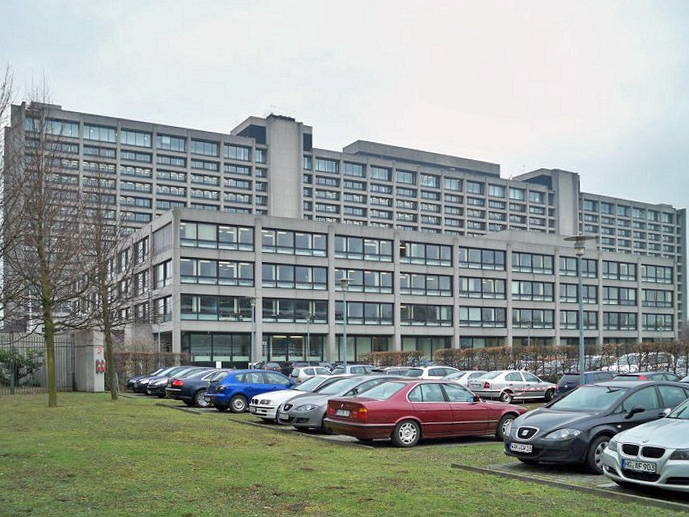
The monumental headquarters of the Bundesbank (1972-2022) outside the center of Frankfurt

The Bundesbank initially operated from the seat of the Bank deutscher Länder on Taunusanlage 4-6 in Frankfurt, itself the former Frankfurt branch of the Reichsbank originally designed by architects Amsler and Heinrich Wolff and completed in 1933.

Starting in 1967, the Bundesbank started developing the new complex in the Bockenheim neighborhood that became its iconic head office building, inaugurated in 1972. That complex was subsequently used by the Bundesbank for half a century. It was listed as a historic landmark in 2022.

In 2016, the Bundesbank initiated a project to revamp its head office complex. In 2022, its staff moved from the Bockenheim building to the city center of Frankfurt, with the bank's leadership and many services relocated in the Frankfurter Büro Center (FBC) tower and others in nearby buildings around François-Mitterrand-Platz. Media reported that the lease for the FBC Tower ran seven years from November 2021, expiring in late 2028.

Following that move, the Bundesbank started a renovation of their Bockenheim complex. By mid-2025, the bank still indicated that it would eventually move back to Bockenheim. But in March 2026, citing rising renovation costs, the Bundesbank announced it had decided not to do so and that the site would be used by the European School. The Bundesbank, however, indicated it would retain its underground vaults for gold storage on the Bockenheim site.

The Frankfurt building that had been the initial site of the Bundesbank remained in use as the Frankfurt branch, and was renovated in the 1980s. As of 2026, the Bundesbank also maintained regional offices and/or branches in Augsburg, Berlin, Bielefeld, Chemnitz, Dortmund, Cologne, Erfurt, Freiburg im Breisgau, Göttingen, Hamburg, Hannover, Karlsruhe, Koblenz, Leipzig, Ludwigshafen, Magdeburg, Mainz, Munich, Neubrandenburg, Nuremberg, Oldenburg, Osnabrück, Regensburg, Reutlingen, Rostock, Saarbrücken, Stuttgart, Ulm, Villingen-Schwenningen, and Würzburg. Among these, those in Freiburg, Hannover, Koblenz, Munich, Reutlingen, and Stuttgart use former branch buildings of the Reichsbank.

== Presidents of the Bundesbank ==
=== Presidents of the predecessors to the Bundesbank ===
- 1948–1957: Karl Bernard, Chairman of the Central Bank Council (Zentralbankrat) of the Bank deutscher Länder
- 1948–1957: Wilhelm Vocke, President of the Directorate of the Bank deutscher Länder, from 1 August 1957

=== Presidents of the Bundesbank ===
- 1958–1969: Karl Blessing
- 1969–1977: Karl Klasen
- 1977–1979: Otmar Emminger
- 1980–1991: Karl Otto Pöhl
- 1991–1993: Helmut Schlesinger
- 1993–1999: Hans Tietmeyer
- 1999–2004: Ernst Welteke
- 2004: Jürgen Stark, interim president
- 2004–2011: Axel A. Weber
- 2011–2021: Jens Weidmann
- Since 2022: Joachim Nagel

== Current Executive Board of the Bundesbank ==
The Bundesbank's decision-making body is the executive board. According to current regulations, it comprises the President, the vice-president and four other members. As of September 2024, its membership is as follows:

- Joachim Nagel (President)
- Sabine Mauderer (vice-president)
- Burkhard Balz
- Lutz Lienenkämper
- Michael Theurer
- Friederike "Fritzi" Köhler-Geib

== Disputes between the Bundesbank and the government ==
The statutory independence of the central bank guaranteed by the Bundesbank Act does not ensure that there will be no disputes between the central bank and government.

=== Dispute over currency union with East Germany ===
One particularly public dispute was in the lead-up to German re-unification. When a customs union was created between the former East Germany (German Democratic Republic) and West Germany (the "old" Federal Republic of Germany), there was a dispute over the rate of exchange for conversion of East German money to Deutschmarks. The Chancellor (Helmut Kohl) decided to ignore the advice of the Bundesbank, and chose an exchange rate of 1:1. The Bundesbank feared that this would be excessively inflationary as well as very significantly impairing the economic prospects of the area of the former East Germany. This dispute was particularly public because of the Bundesbank policy of communicating openly on such matters. Although public opinion normally supported the Bundesbank in matters of combating inflation, in this case Helmut Kohl prevailed, and the President of the Bundesbank, Pöhl, resigned. The Bundesbank had to use monetary measures to offset the inflationary effect.

== The Bundesbank in the news ==
In 2004 the president of the Bundesbank, Ernst Welteke, resigned after the press published allegations that his hotel bills for a New Year celebration had been paid by a commercial bank and he was criticized for his handling of the affair. There were also some allegations that this was part of a political intrigue to remove Welteke from office because he opposed selling Bundesbank gold reserves, as desired by the government. After Pöhl (see above), Welteke was the second Bundesbank president to resign.

On Wednesday, 24 February 2016, as part of the Bundesbank's annual news conference, Bundesbank president and European Central Bank Governing Council member, Jens Weidmann, dismissed deflation in light of the ECB's current stimulus program, pointing out the healthy condition of the German economy and that the euro area isn't that bad off, on the eve of the 9–10 March 2016 meetings.

== Involvement in the Euro area crisis ==
In June 2012, it was estimated that the Bundesbank had €644 billion exposure to other central banks in the eurozone under the TARGET2 payment system. Only three other eurozone central banks had net exposure from the system; all others had the offsetting net exposure due to the system. The net exposure finances trade imbalances and capital flight. The Bundesbank is the largest shareholder of the European Central Bank. The ECB has bought up more than €200 billion in sovereign debt from crisis-ridden countries. Some of this would have to be written off in the case of a euro collapse, which would entail corresponding losses for the Bundesbank.

On 27 January 2014, the Bundesbank called for a capital levy on citizens of a nation before that nation applies for relief under the European Financial Stability Facility. The levy "corresponds to the principle of national responsibility, according to which tax payers are responsible for their government's obligations before solidarity of other states is required". This followed an IMF report from October 2013 which proposed a similar wealth tax.

== Publications of the Bundesbank ==
The Bundesbank produces a number of regular publications and statistics (see Web site)

- English publications of the Bundesbank
- Financial Stability Review

== See also ==
- Economy of Germany
- German mark
- List of banks in Germany
- List of central banks
