= Burkhard Balz =

German politician of the Christian Democratic Union of Germany (born 1969)

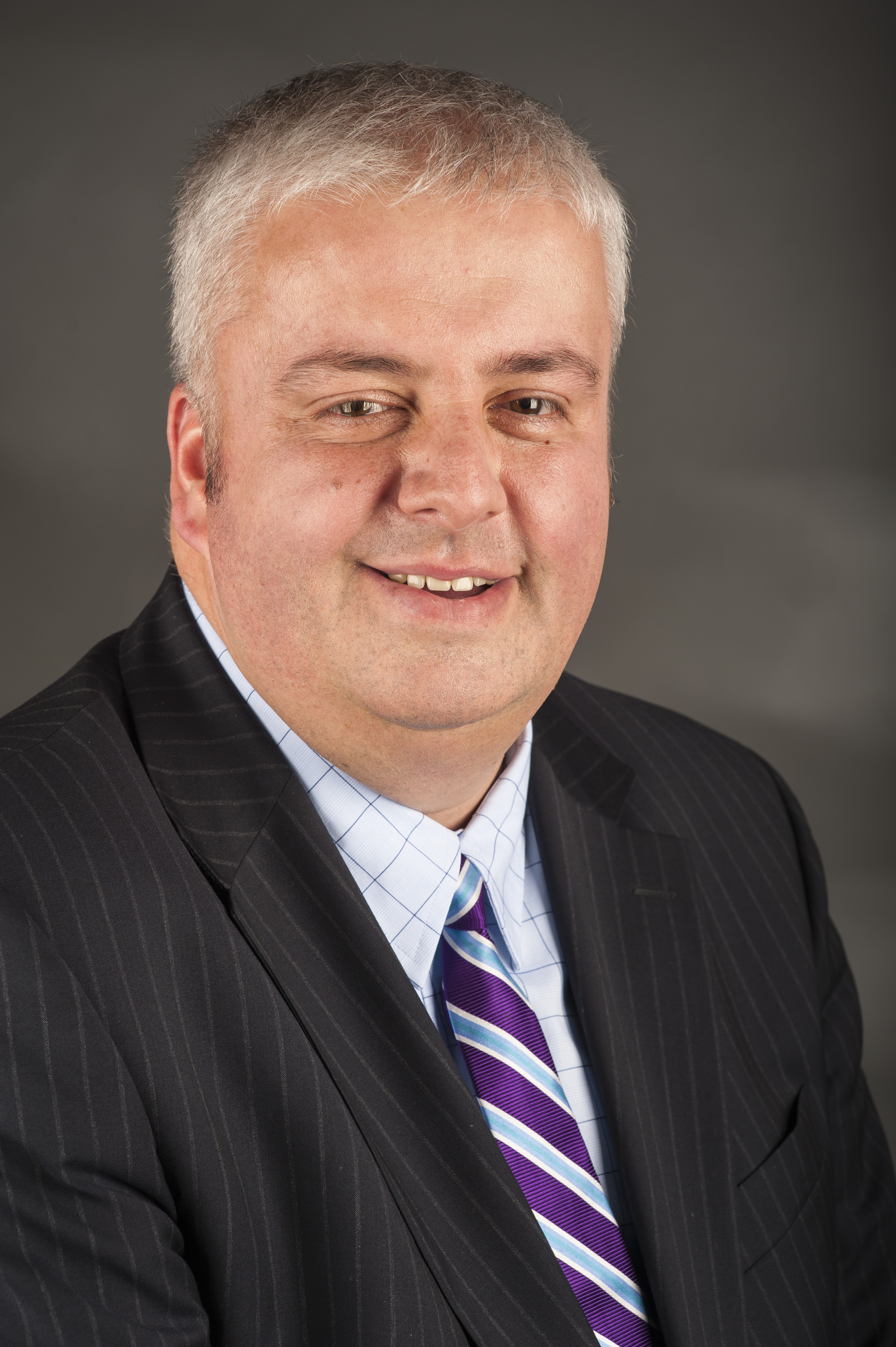

Member of the European Parliament
- In office 1 July 2009 – 31 August 2018
- Constituency: Germany

Personal details
- Born: 24 July 1969 (age 57) Lemgo, West Germany
- Party: German: Christian Democratic Union; EU: European People's Party
- Education: University of Göttingen
- Website: www.burkhard-balz.eu

Burkhard Balz (born 24 July 1969) is a German politician of the Christian Democratic Union of Germany, part of the European People's Party. From 2009 until 2018, he served as Member of the European Parliament (MEP) from Germany. Since 2018 is a board member of the Deutsche BundesBank.

== Early career ==
Between 2000 and 2009, Balz held various positions at Commerzbank in Hannover, Frankfurt am Main, Tokyo, London and Brussels.

== Political career ==
=== Member of the European Parliament, 2009–2018 ===
In the European Parliament, Balz was a member of the Committee on Economic and Monetary Affairs (ECON), the Special Committee on the Financial, Economic and Social Crisis (CRIS) and the Parliament's delegation for relations with the countries of Southeast Asia and the Association of Southeast Asian Nations (ASEAN). In 2013, he served as the Parliament's rapporteur on Latvia’s accession to the eurozone. He joined the Special Committee on Tax Rulings and Other Measures Similar in Nature or Effect in 2015 and the Committee of Inquiry into Money Laundering, Tax Avoidance and Tax Evasion in 2016.

In addition, Balz was substitute for the Committee on Transport and Tourism (TRAN) and the parliament's delegation for relations with the People's Republic of China.

=== Member of the board of the Bundesbank, 2018–2026 ===
In early 2018, Balz was nominated to join the board of Deutsche Bundesbank, Germany's central bank, for an eight-year term, replacing Andreas Dombret. In 2026, he decided against extending his contract.

== Other activities ==
=== Corporate boards ===
- Apaton Capital AG, member of the supervisory board (since 2007)
- ARAG Group, member of the advisory board (since 2014)
- Bausparkasse Schwäbisch Hall, Ombudsman (since 2012)
- MVI PROPLANT Nord GmbH, member of the advisory board (since 2014)
- Sparda-Banken, member of the advisory board (since 2012)

=== Non-profit organizations ===
- Baden-Badener Unternehmer-Gespräche (BBUG), member of the board of trustees
- Senckenberg Nature Research Society, member of the board of trustees
- Kangaroo Group, member
