= Joachim Nagel =

German economist and banker

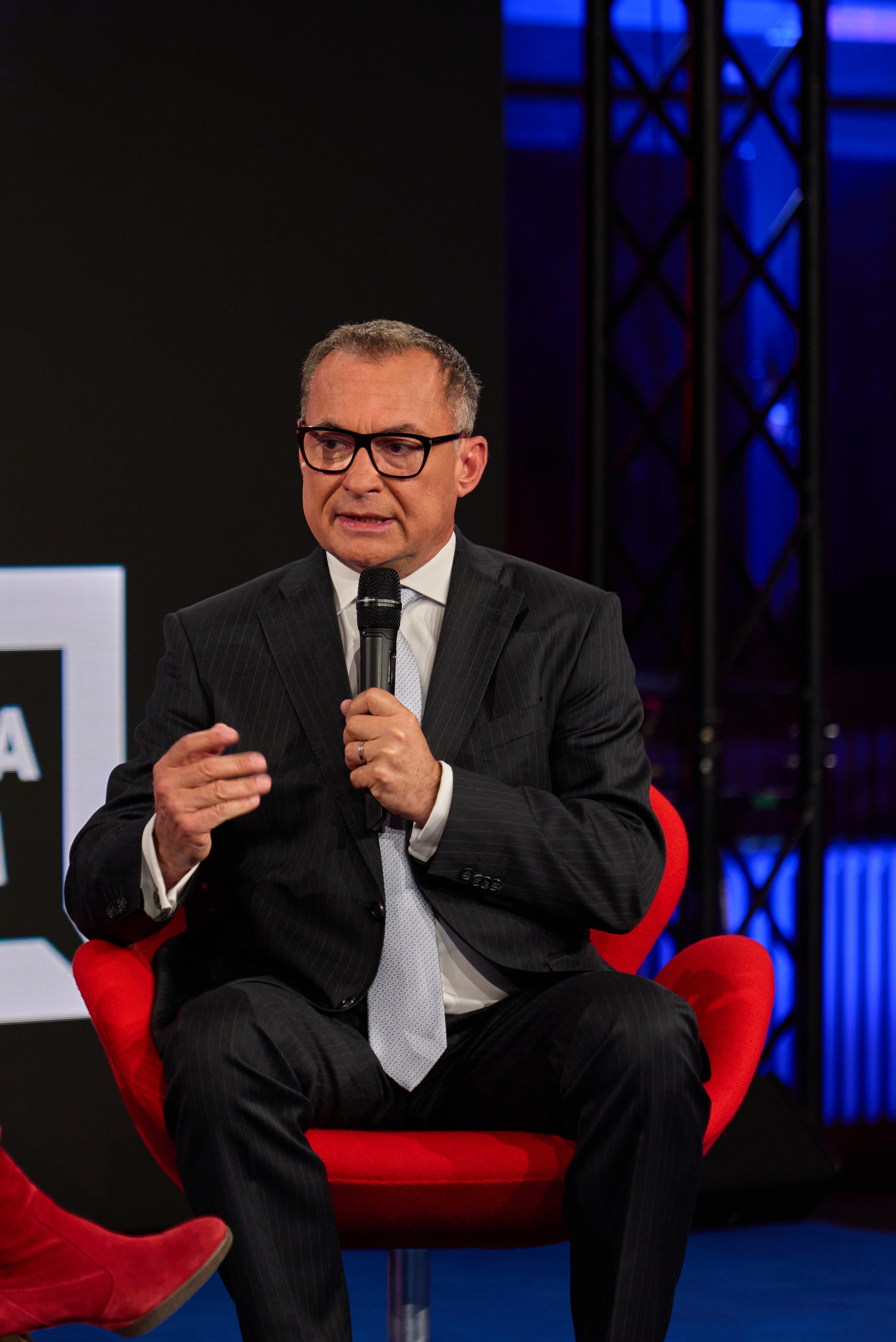

10th President of the German Bundesbank
- Incumbent
- Assumed office 1 January 2022
- Appointed by: Frank-Walter Steinmeier
- Preceded by: Jens Weidmann

Personal details
- Born: 31 May 1966 (age 60) Karlsruhe, West Germany (now Germany)
- Party: Social Democratic Party
- Children: 2
- Education: Karlsruhe Institute of Technology

Joachim Nagel (born 31 May 1966) is a German economist who has been serving as President of the Bundesbank since 2022. He sat on the Bundesbank's Executive Board from 2010 to 2016 and on the Executive Board of KfW Group from 2017 to 2020, and from 2020 to 2021 he was deputy head of the Banking Department at the Bank for International Settlements. He was appointed Bundesbank president in January 2022 for an eight-year term, succeeding Jens Weidmann. He is a member of the Social Democratic Party of Germany (SPD), along with the President who appointed him to serve initially under SPD Chancellor Olaf Scholz.

== Early life and education ==
After graduating from the Otto-Hahn-Gymnasium Karlsruhe, Nagel studied economics at the Karlsruhe Institute of Technology.

== Career ==
After graduating in 1991, Nagel worked at the Karlsruhe Institute of Technology as a research assistant and later an advisor for economic and financial policy at the Social Democratic Party (SPD) in Bonn from March to October 1994. Funded by the SEW-EURODRIVE-Stiftung, he also spent a year in Washington doing research.

In 1999 Nagel moved to the Bundesbank, initially as Head of the Office of the President of the then State Central Bank in Bremen, Lower Saxony and Saxony-Anhalt in Hanover. In 2003 he moved to the headquarters of the Bundesbank in Frankfurt am Main. In 2008 he became head of the central department Markets. In December 2010, he replaced Thilo Sarrazin, who had resigned, on the board of directors of the Deutsche Bundesbank. On April 30, 2016, he resigned from the Executive Board of the Deutsche Bundesbank.

On November 1, 2016, Nagel joined the KFW Bankengruppe, the largest public development bank in Germany, as a general manager and then from 2017 to 2020 as Executive Board member. At the same time he was chairman of the supervisory board of KfW IPEX-Bank and first deputy chairman of the supervisory board of DEG German investment and development company.

On November 1, 2020, Nagel became a member of the management of the Bank for International Settlements as Deputy Head of Banking.

=== President of the Bundesbank ===
On December 20, 2021, the German President Frank-Walter Steinmeier announced Nagel's appointment as successor to Jens Weidmann as president of the Deutsche Bundesbank. He assumed the position on 1 January 2022.

== Other activities ==
=== International organizations ===
- European Systemic Risk Board (ESRB), Ex-Officio Member of the General Board (since 2022)
- Bank for International Settlements (BIS), Ex-Officio Member of the Board of Directors (since 2022)
- Financial Stability Board (FSB), Ex-Officio Member (since 2022)
- International Monetary Fund (IMF), Ex-Officio Member of the Board of Governors (since 2022)

=== Corporate boards ===
- Deutsche Börse AG, Member of the Supervisory Board (2018–2020)

=== Non-profit organizations ===
- Osservatorio Permanente Giovani-Editori, International Advisory Board (since 2023)
- House of Finance, Goethe University Frankfurt, Member of the Board of Trustees

== Personal life ==
Nagel is married and has two children.
