= Gerhard Schick =

German economist and politician

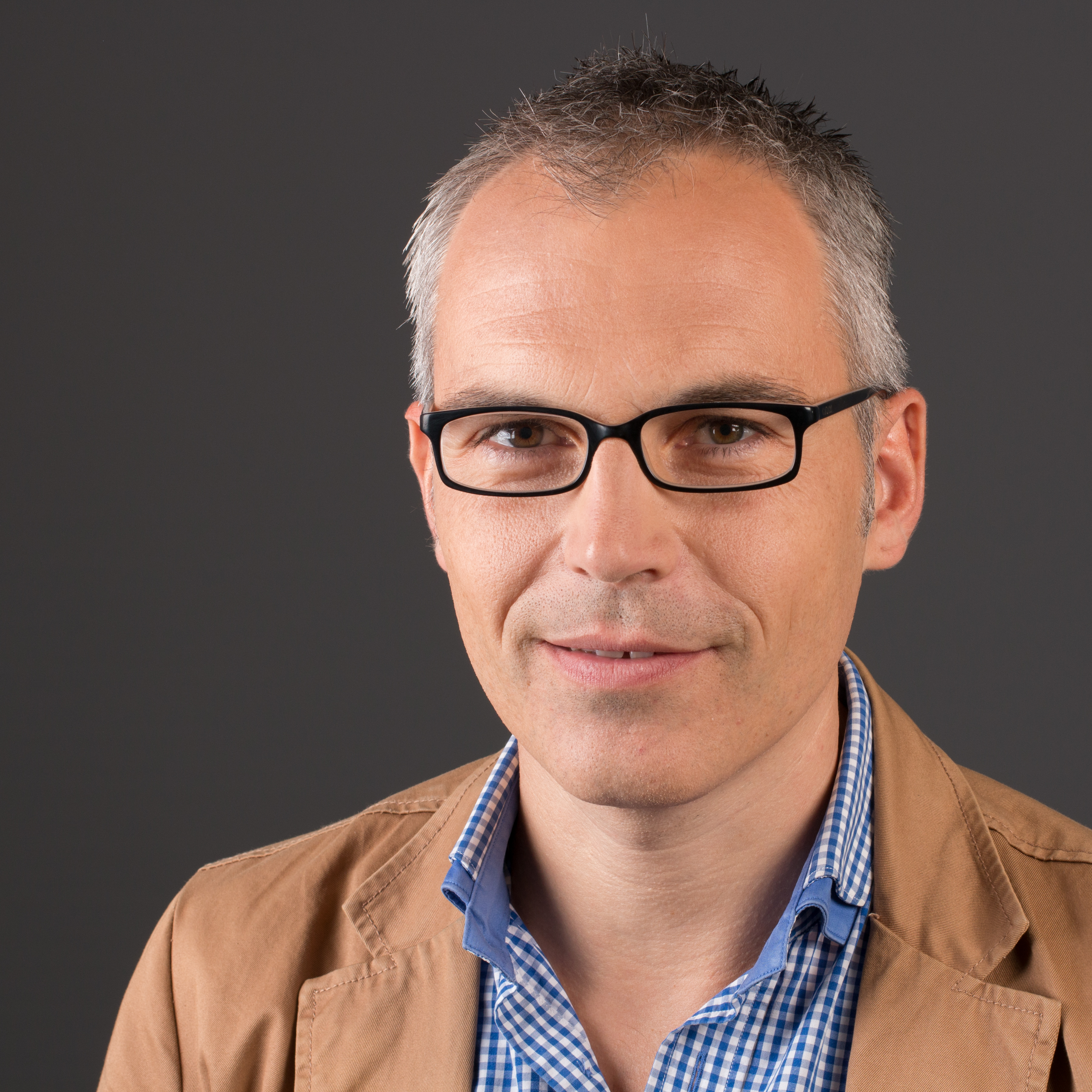
- Gerhard Schick in 2014.

Member of the German Bundestag
- In office 2005–2019

Personal details
- Born: 18 April 1972 (age 54) Hechingen, Baden-Württemberg
- Party: Green Party
- Education: University of Freiburg
- Profession: Economist
- Website: www.gerhardschick.net

Gerhard Schick (born 18 April 1972) is a German economist and finance expert who heads Finance Watch Deutschland. He previously served as a member of the German Bundestag for the Green Party.

== Education and early career ==
After completing his secondary school education in 1991 at the Gymnasium Hechingen, Schick completed his Community Service and graduated in 1992. Between 1992 and 1998 Schick continued with his economics education at the University of Bamberg, University of Freiburg and Complutense University of Madrid where he was awarded his Diplom in Economics. Subsequently, until 2001 he was a research associate at the Walter Eucken Institute Albert-Ludwigs-Universität Freiburg and then from 2001 to 2004 the Market Economy Foundation in Berlin. In 2002 he was awarded a Ph.D. in Finance from the Albert-Ludwigs-Universität Freiburg for his work on "Dual Federalism in Europe". In 2004 he joined the Bertelsmann Foundation in Gütersloh as a project manager.

== Political career ==
Schick has been a member of the German Parliament since the 2005 federal elections, representing Baden-Württemberg. He has been regularly elected from the land list, having unsuccessfully contested the Mannheim constituency.

Schick has been the Alliance 90/The Greens parliamentary group's spokesman on financial policy since 2007. From its inception in 2008, he has been a member of the Financial Markets Panel, which provides parliamentary oversight of the Financial Market Stabilization Agency (FMSA). Following the 2013 federal elections, he was elected deputy chairman of the Finance Committee.

- October 2008 - Member of the Alliance 90/The Greens Party Council.
- September 2007 - Speaker of the fiscal Alliance 90/The Greens parliamentary group.
- April 2006 - Member of the Parliamentary Advisory Council for Sustainable Development (Chairman since 2007).
- February 2006 - February 2007 - Member of the Commission in the federal executive of Alliance 90/The Greens to reduce bureaucracy.
- October 2005 - Member of the German Bundestag Bündnis 90/Die Grünen.
- June 2005 - Member of the Program Committee of the Bundestag Program 2005.
- November 2004 - February 2006 - Member of the Commission on Demographic Change of Alliance 90/The Greens.
- July 2003 - September 2004 - Member of the Economic Policy Commission of Alliance 90/The Greens.
- November 2002 - May 2003 - Member of the Social Commission of Alliance 90/The Greens.
- September / October 2002 - Member of the negotiating teams for Economic and Labor in the coalition negotiations between Bündnos90/The Greens and the Sozialdemokratische Partei Deutschlands.
- April 2001 - June 2007 - Speaker of the Federal Association for Economic and Financial Affairs of Alliance 90/The Greens.
- February 2000 - May 2001 - Speaker of the State Association of Economy and Finance of Alliance 90/The Greens in Baden-Wuerttemberg.
- October 1999 - Candidacy for Freiburg Council.
- Since October 1996 - Member of Alliance 90/The Greens.

Additional to this he has written several publications.

In September 2018, Schick announced that he would resign from his parliamentary seat. He resigned by the end of 2018.

== Finance Watch Deutschland ==
Schick led the creation of a new nongovernmental Organisation called "Bürgerbewegung Finanzwende" (Finance Watch Deutschland), which cooperates with Finance Watch.

== Other activities ==
- Nuclear Waste Disposal Fund, Alternate Member of the Board of Trustees (since 2018)
- Institut Solidarische Moderne (ISM), Member (since 2010)
