= Bank deutscher Länder =

West German central bank

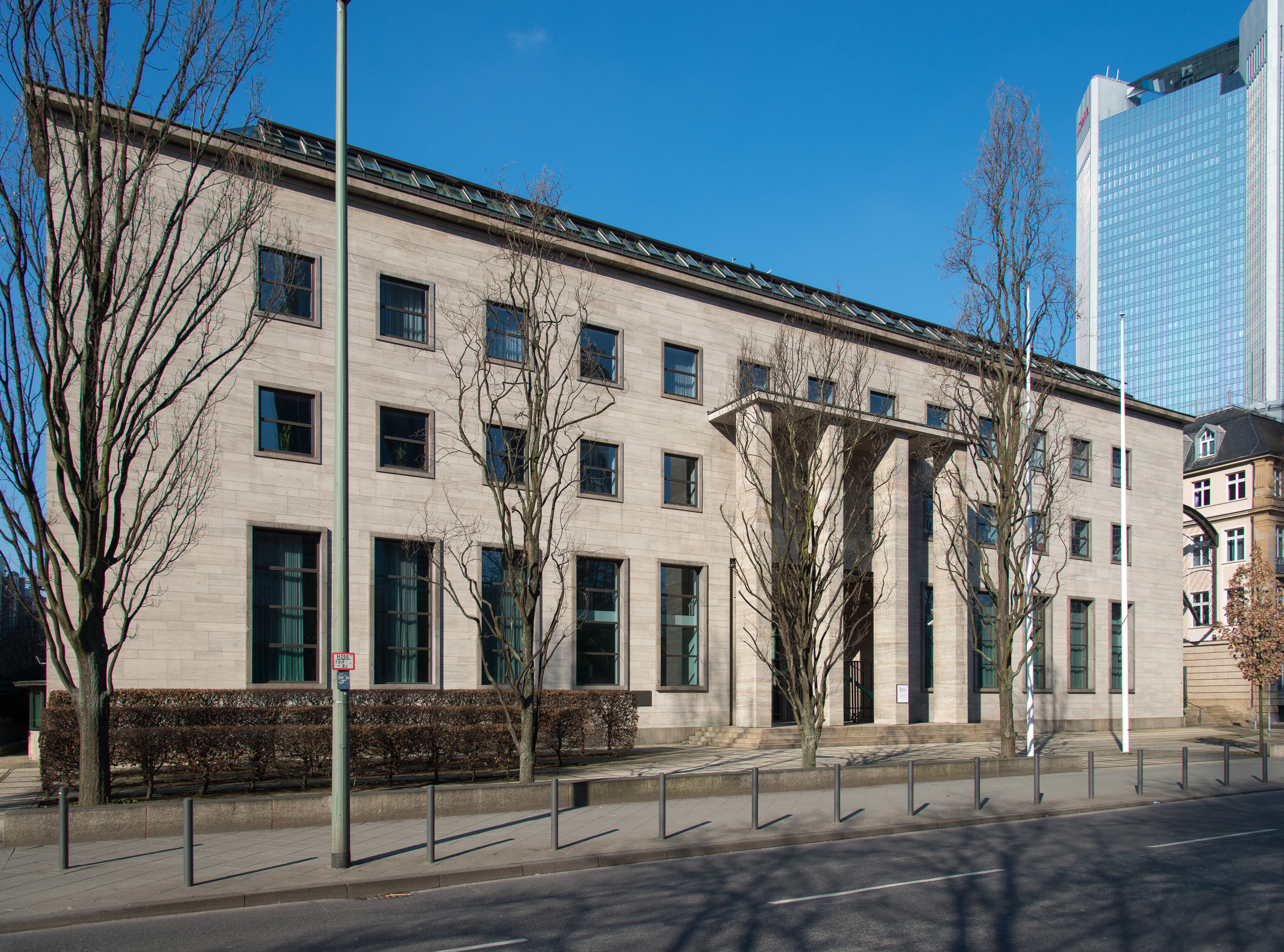
The Bank deutscher Länder was established in 1948 in the former Frankfurt branch of the Reichsbank, Taunusanlage 4–6, built in 1933

The Bank deutscher Länder (BdL, lit. 'Bank of the German States') was a central bank established in 1948 to serve West Germany, issuing the Deutsche Mark. It was replaced in 1957 by the Deutsche Bundesbank.

== Background ==
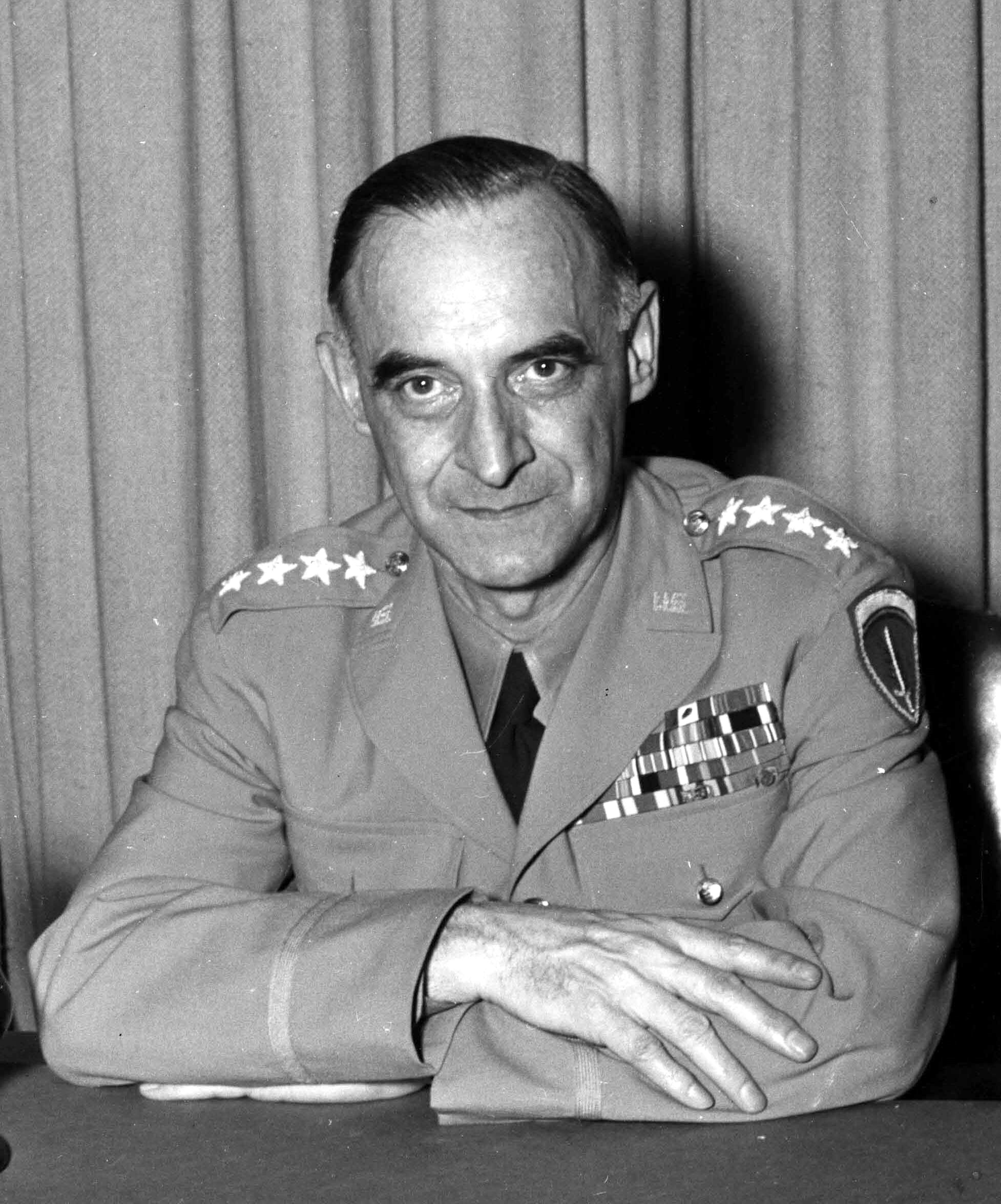
General Lucius D. Clay (1898-1978, photographed in 1949) was a key promoter of the Bank deutscher Länder

In the immediate aftermath of German defeat in 1945, the Reichsbank was placed under joint Allied custodianship pending its liquidation. In line with the Morgenthau Plan, the American authorities in November 1945 proposed a radically decentralized plan that would have organized a separate financial system in each of the Länder, with minimal central coordination. After some hesitancy, the French authorities rallied that vision; the British authorities were initially reluctant, but gradually aligned with U.S. views following the establishment of the Bizone on 1 January 1947.

Thus, Land central banks (German: Landeszentralbanken) were created on 1 January 1947 in American-occupied Munich (for Bavaria), Stuttgart (for Württemberg-Baden), and Wiesbaden (for Hesse), followed in March by French-occupied Tübingen (for Württemberg-Hohenzollern), Freiburg im Breisgau (for South Baden), and Mainz (for Rhineland-Palatinate), then American-occupied Bremen on 1 April 1947, and eventually British-occupied Düsseldorf (for North Rhine-Westphalia), Hanover (for Lower Saxony), Kiel (for Schleswig-Holstein) and Hamburg by the Spring of 1948.

== Establishment and development until 1957 ==
In 1947, newly appointed U.S. Military Governor Lucius D. Clay decided, against directives from Washington, that Germany needed a central bank instead of a mere board bringing together the Landeszentralbanken for joint policy decisions. An agreement on that concept was reached among the three Western occupying forces on 30 October 1947, resulting in the establishment of the Bank deutscher Länder on 1 March 1948, initially formed by the Landeszentralbanken in the Bizone.

On 21 June 1948, the BdL introduced the Deutsche Mark in the three western zones of occupation. On 1 November 1948, the Landeszentralbanken of the French zone joined the BdL. The capital stock of the BdL, 100,000 Deutsche Mark, was provided by the Landeszentralbanken. When the BdL was established, 300 people worked there, but by 1949, their number had already increased to 1,450. Even after the Federal Republic of Germany was founded in May 1949, the BdL remained subject to the control of the three Western Allied powers until 1951.

Institutions of the BdL were the board of directors and the Zentralbankrat (Central Banking Council), consisting of the nine presidents of the Landeszentralbanken. These officials elected the president of the board of directors, who then chose the other members of the board. The board's task was to enforce the resolutions of the Zentralbankrat.

Effective 1 August 1957, the BdL and the central banks of the German states were merged in the new Deutsche Bundesbank with the Landeszentralbanken transformed into mere subsidiaries of the Bundesbank in accordance with the Federal law establishing the Bundesbank.

== See also ==
- German mark
- Deutsche Bundesbank
- List of banks in Germany
