= Karl Klasen =

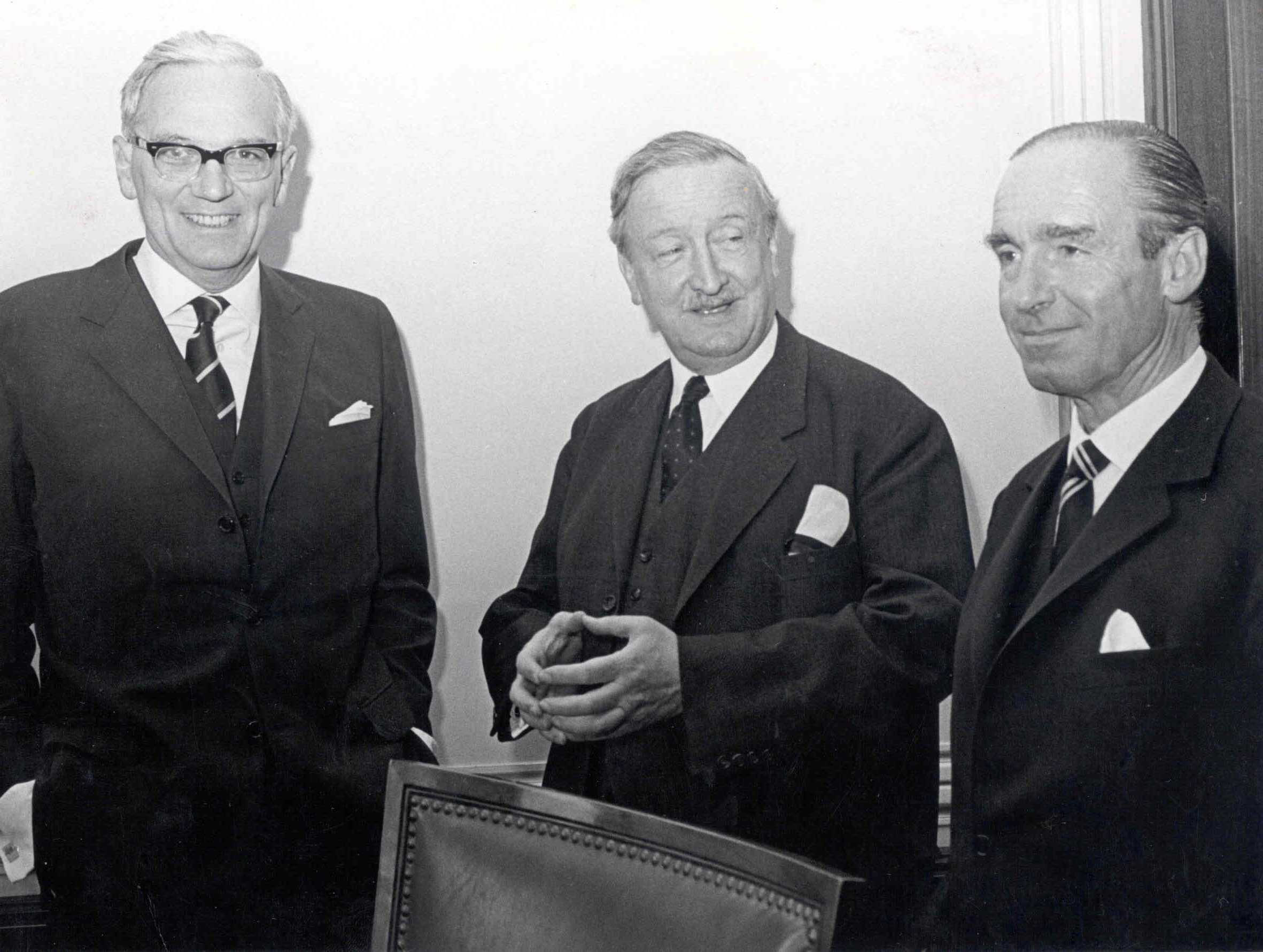
- Klasen (left), with Hermann Josef Abs and Franz Heinrich Ulrich (right) on 12 April 1967

President of the Deutsche Bundesbank
- In office 1970–1977

Personal details
- Born: 23 April 1909 Hamburg
- Died: 22 April 1991 (aged 81) Hamburg
- Occupation: Jurist

Karl Klasen (23 April 1909 – 22 April 1991) was a German jurist and served as president of the Bundesbank from 1970 to 1977. He was co-head of Deutsche Bank from 1967 to 1969.

== Early life and education ==
Klasen was born in Hamburg to a working-class family. His father was a low-paid employee of a shipping company. Klasen studied law and completed a doctoral dissertation focusing on human rights, with the intention of pursuing a judicial career. In the early 1930s, while still a student, he joined the Social Democratic Party as a conscious response to the rise of Adolf Hitler and National Socialism. As a result of his political affiliation, the Nazi authorities blocked his entry into the judiciary in 1935.

== Career ==
Denied a judicial post by the Nazi regime, Klasen began his professional career in 1935 as a legal adviser in Hamburg for a German banking institution, a position he retained throughout the Second World War. He served in the German army during the war and, following Germany’s defeat, returned to Hamburg, where he became involved in postwar reconstruction efforts, including the rebuilding of the city’s merchant fleet and financial institutions.

After the war, Klasen rejoined the Hamburg banking sector and steadily rose through the ranks. In 1952, he became a member of the board of a major German bank, and by 1964 he was appointed co-head of the institution, reflecting his growing influence within West German banking circles.

=== President of the Bundesbank ===
Klasen was appointed president of the Deutsche Bundesbank in the late 1960s and held the position until his retirement in 1977. His tenure coincided with the collapse of the Bretton Woods system of fixed exchange rates, which had governed international currency relations since the end of the Second World War. During this period of uncertainty, he pursued a strict monetary policy aimed at price stability and the defense of the German mark against speculative pressures.

In 1972, as European currencies began to float, Klasen confronted the West German finance minister, Karl Schiller, over proposals to allow the mark to weaken in response to market forces. Klasen successfully persuaded the federal cabinet to maintain a firm defence of the currency, a decision that ultimately led to Schiller’s resignation from office. Under Klasen’s leadership, the mark emerged as one of the world’s most stable and trusted currencies, a reputation it retained long after he departed from office.

=== Later career ===
After leaving the Bundesbank, Klasen continued to play a role in German and international finance as a member of the supervisory board of a major commercial bank, the successor to the Hamburg institution where he had begun his career decades earlier. He described his decision to leave a highly paid private-sector position to enter public service as "the crown of my career", noting that it involved a substantial salary reduction and the relinquishment of numerous corporate directorships.

== Personal life ==
Klasen was married and had two daughters and a son.

== Death ==
Klasen died in Hamburg on 22 April 1991 at the age of 81. His death was reported by German monetary authorities, and later accounts indicated that the cause was cancer.
