= Stiftung Marktwirtschaft =

Liberal German economic think tank

The Stiftung Marktwirtschaft (Market Economy Foundation) is a liberal German economic think tank which counts several leading liberal German economists as members and contributors.

== History and organization ==
The foundation belongs to the Stockholm Network. The scientific advisory committee associated with the think tank is known under the name “Kronberger Kreis.” Since 1998, the foundation has awarded Wolfram Engels Prize ("Wolfram-Engels-Preis").

The foundation was founded in 1982 under the name “Frankfurter Institut.” Since 2001, it has been based in Berlin, Germany. According to its statements, the foundation does not receive state funding and is financed through the sale of its publications, donations, and membership fees. The directors of the foundation are Bernd Raffelhüschen and Michael Eilfort, who was the chief of staff of German Christian-Democrat politician Friedrich Merz. Among the foundations past economic contributors was Gerhard Schick, the financial speaker of the German Green Party.

The primary areas of focus of the foundation include the labor market, the social security system, resources, and taxation. In contrast to other like-minded initiatives, the foundation implements its goals through direct discussions with policymakers.

== Tax Law Commission ==
The foundation's “Tax Law Commission” (Kommission Steuergesetzbuch), which began its activities in 2004 under the leadership of Joachim Lang, proposes changes to the tax system and includes 76 economic, legal, business, and political experts, including Friedrich Merz, Ingolf Deubel, Hermann Otto Solms, and Kurt Faltlhauser.

== Swift Prize for Economic Satire ==
Beginning in 2008, the foundation has awarded the biennial Swift Prize for Economic Satire, named after Jonathan Swift. The prize rewards authors of publications that have furthered free, market-oriented economic policies with a €10,000 prize. The winners have been:

- 2008: Volker Reiche, author of the comic strip “Strizz”
- 2010: Martin Suter, Swiss author of the satirical column “Business Class”
