= Karl Otto Pöhl =

German economist (1929–2014)

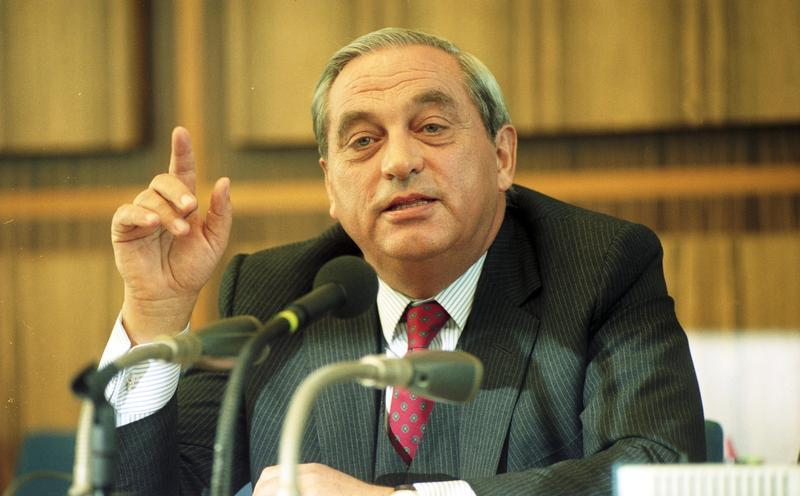
- Born: 1 December 1929; Hanover
- Died: 9 December 2014
- Occupations: Economist, economic journalist
- Awards: Tie Man of the Year (1990)

Karl Otto Pöhl (1 December 1929 – 9 December 2014) was a German economist and a president of the Bundesbank and chairman of its Central Bank Council from 1980 to 1991.

Born in Hanover, Lower Saxony, Pöhl worked as a sports reporter to help pay his way through the Georg August University of Göttingen. A graduate economist, he became a researcher and department head of the publications department at the Ifo Institute for Economic Research in Munich. In the 1960s he worked as an economic journalist in Bonn until the Social Democratic Party of Germany won the 1969 national election. He then was employed by the Federal government's Economics Ministry and then the Finance Ministry.

During the 1970s and 1980s, Pöhl was the driving force behind German efforts to get Europe's rampant inflation under control and to lay the framework for broad monetary cooperation among industrialized countries. He is referred to as one of the fathers of the Euro.

Pöhl was a partner in Sal. Oppenheim Jr. & Cie., a German private investment bank and a member of the advisory board of the Carlyle Group. He had also been a member of the influential Washington-based financial advisory body, the Group of Thirty since 1992. He sat on the advisory boards of Royal Dutch Shell, Gulfstream, GAMCO, VW, Barrick Gold, Unilever and Rolls-Royce.

Karl Otto Pöhl was married, had four children and lived in Zurich. He died on 9 December 2014 at the age of 85.

== See also ==
- Delors Committee
