= Birgitta Wolff =

German economist and politician

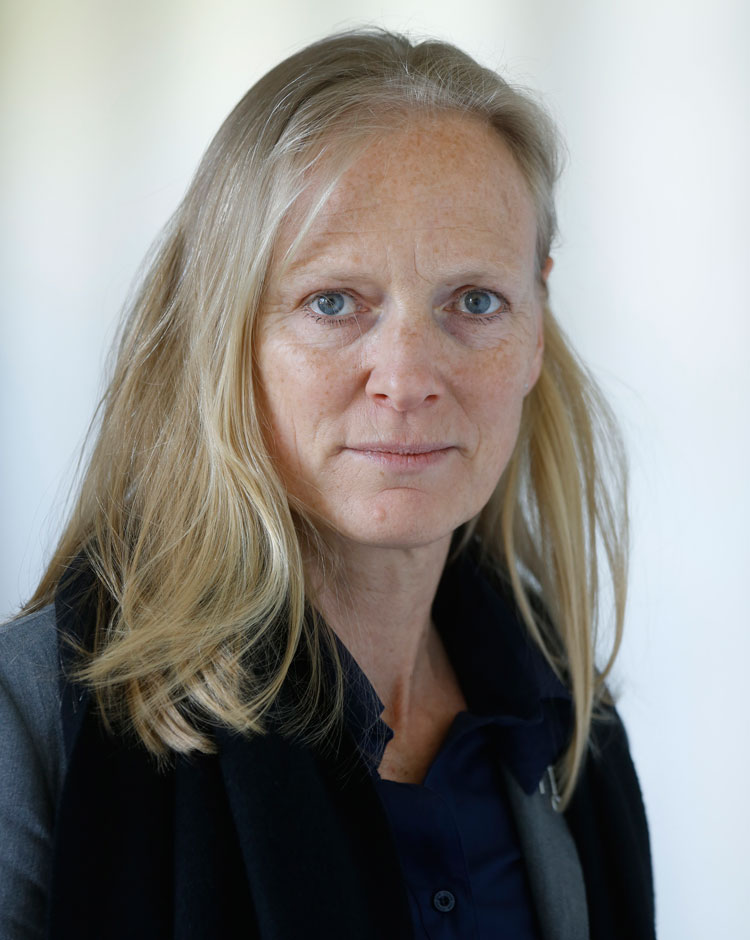
- Wolff in 2015
- Born: 14 July 1965 (age 60); Münster, West Germany (now Germany)
- Occupations: German economist, politician

Birgitta Wolff (born 14 July 1965 in Münster) is a German economist and politician of the Christian Democratic Union (CDU). She served as minister of education and culture and as minister of research and economy in the state government of Saxony-Anhalt from 2010 to 2013, and as president of the Goethe University Frankfurt from 2015 to 2020.

== Academic career ==
Wolff studied at Witten/Herdecke University, LMU Munich, and Harvard University. After her Habilitation at LMU Munich, she taught at the Edmund A. Walsh School of Foreign Service at Georgetown University (1999–2000), and became professor of business administration and international management at the Otto von Guericke University Magdeburg. In 2002, she spent a year at the Stanford Graduate School of Business. She has been a visiting professor at universities in Ukraine, Brazil and China.

In 2014, she was elected as president of the Goethe University Frankfurt, and she held the office from 1 January 2015 to 31 December 2020. Her re-election failed in two ballots, and her successor Enrico Schleiff was elected in the 3rd ballot with 18 of 34 votes.

== Political career ==
In 2010, Wolff became state minister of education and culture in the state government of Minister-President Reiner Haseloff of Saxony-Anhalt. From 2011 to 2013, she served as state minister of research and economy.

== Other activities (selection) ==
=== Corporate boards ===
- Deutsche Bank, member of the advisory board (since 2017)
- Norddeutsche Landesbank (NORD/LB), member of the advisory board

=== University bodies ===
- Botanical Garden, Goethe University Frankfurt, ex officio member of the board of trustees (2015–2021)
- Frankfurt Institute for Advanced Studies, Goethe University Frankfurt, ex officio member of the board of trustees (2015–2021)
- Fritz Bauer Institute, Goethe University Frankfurt, ex officio member of the board of trustees (2015–2021)
- Frobenius Institute, Goethe University Frankfurt, ex officio member of the board of trustees (2015–2021)
- House of Finance, Goethe University Frankfurt, ex officio member of the board of trustees (2015–2021)
- Institute for Law and Finance, Goethe University Frankfurt, Member of the Board of Trustees (2015–2021)
- Institute for Monetary and Financial Stability (IMFS), Goethe University Frankfurt, ex officio member of the board of trustees (2015–2021)
- Institute for Social Research (IfS), Goethe University Frankfurt, ex officio member of the board of trustees (2015–2021)
- Museum Giersch, Goethe University Frankfurt, ex officio member of the advisory board (2015–2021)
- Paul Ehrlich Foundation, Goethe University Frankfurt, ex officio member of the board of trustees (2015–2021)
- University Hospital Frankfurt, Goethe University Frankfurt, ex officio member of the board of trustees (2015–2021)

=== Non-profit organizations ===
- Federal Agency for Disruptive Innovation (SPRIN-D), Deputy Chairwoman of the Supervisory Board (since 2020)
- Max Planck Institute for Brain Research, Member of the Board of Trustees (since 2016)
- International Building Exhibition (IBA) Urban Redevelopment 2010, ex officio member of the board of trustees
- Centre for Higher Education (CHE), member of the advisory board
- Ernst Strüngmann Institute (ESI), member of the advisory board
- Fazit-Stiftung, member of the board of trustees
- Peace Research Institute Frankfurt (HSFK), member of the board of trustees
- Humboldt University of Berlin, member of the scientific advisory board
- Konrad Adenauer Foundation (KAS), member of the board of trustees
- Marketing Club Frankfurt, member of the board of trustees
- Leopoldina, member of the Senate
- Natural History Museum, Berlin, member of the scientific advisory board
- Senckenberg Nature Research Society, member of the board of trustees
- Volkswagen Foundation, Member of the Board of Trustees
- Center for Science and Research Management (ZWM), member of the board
- Johanna-Quandt-Universitätsstiftung, member of the advisory board
- Stifterverband für die Deutsche Wissenschaft, member of the Hightech Forum
- ZDF, member of the board of directors (since 2017)
