= Enrico Schleiff =

German biologist and physicist

- Born: 17 November 1971; Luckenwalde, East Germany (now Germany)
- Education: Charles University; University of Mainz; University of Basel; McGill University
- Scientific career
- Fields: Cell biology
- Workplaces: Goethe University Frankfurt

Enrico Schleiff (born 17 November 1971) is a German biologist and physicist, and the president of the Goethe University Frankfurt, serving since 1 January 2021.

== Career ==
=== Early career ===
Schleiff studied physics at Charles University in Prague from 1990 to 1992, and at the University of Mainz from 1992 to 1995. He completed his master's thesis at the University of Basel in 1995, and then received a Ph.D. from the Department of Biochemistry at McGill University in Montreal. He then worked as a research assistant at Kiel University and at LMU Munich, where he completed his habilitation in cell biology and botany in 2003.

=== University of Frankfurt ===
Schleiff has been a professor at the Goethe University Frankfurt since 2007. He was elected vice president in 2012 and held this office until 2018. In 2020, he was elected president of the university in succession to Birgitta Wolff. He was chairman of the board of the Frankfurt Institute for Advanced Studies from 2018 to 2020.

== Other activities ==
- Frankfurt Institute for Advanced Studies, Goethe University Frankfurt, Ex-Officio Member of the Board of Trustees (since 2021)
- Fraunhofer Institute for Translational Medicine and Pharmacology (ITMP), Member of the Board of Trustees
- Fritz Bauer Institute, Member of the Board of Trustees (since 2021)
- House of Finance, Goethe University Frankfurt, Ex-Officio Member of the Board of Trustees (since 2021)
- Institute for Law and Finance, Goethe University Frankfurt, Ex-Officio Member of the Board of Trustees (since 2021)
- Institute for Monetary and Financial Stability (IMFS), Goethe University Frankfurt, Ex-Officio Member of the Board of Trustees (since 2021)
- Paul Ehrlich Foundation, Goethe University Frankfurt, Ex-Officio Member of the Board of Trustees (since 2021)
- University Hospital Frankfurt, Goethe University Frankfurt, Ex-Officio Member of the Board of Trustees (since 2021)

== Recognition ==
Schleiff received the Eduard Strasburger Prize of the German Botanical Society in 2004.
