= Paul Bernd Spahn =

German economist (1939–2025)

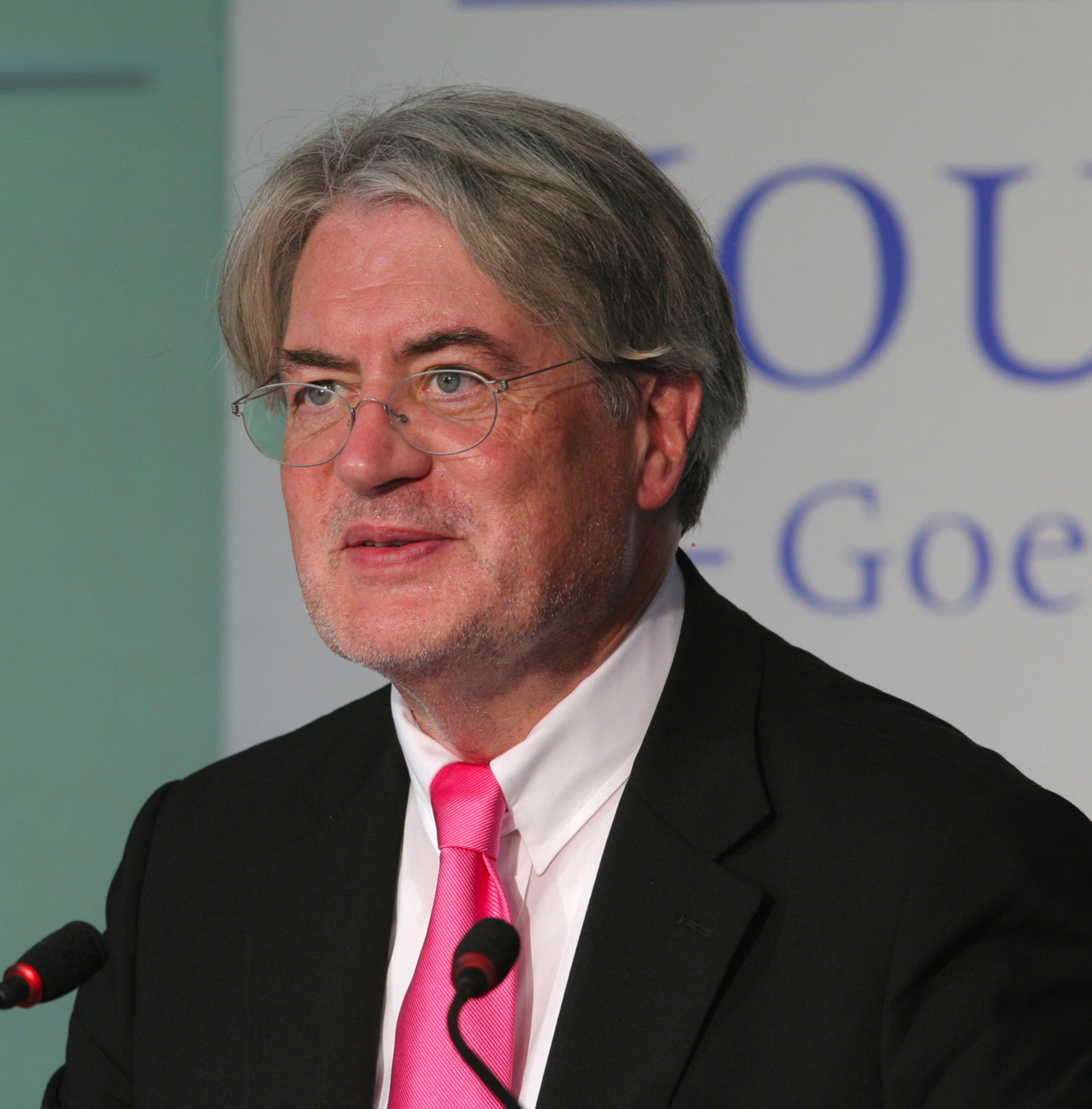
Paul Bernd Spahn (2008), during the inauguration of the House of Finance, Frankfurt

Paul Bernd Spahn (17 October 1939 – 30 May 2025) was a German economist who was professor of public finance at the Goethe University Frankfurt.

== Life and career ==
Born in Darmstadt, Spahn studied economics at the universities of Frankfurt, Paris (Sorbonne) and Rio de Janeiro and obtained his doctoral degree from the Free University of Berlin. Having spent more than five years at the German Institute for Economic Research in Berlin (DIW) he worked at various institutions such as Harvard University in Cambridge, Massachusetts, the Australian National University in Canberra, and the Organisation for Economic Co-operation and Development in Paris. In 1979 he was appointed to the Goethe University.

Spahn was Vice President of Goethe University from 1986 to 1987 and the first Executive Director of the House of Finance in Frankfurt from September 2006 to June 2008. He was engaged in the establishment of the Goethe Business School and the Institute for Law and Finance in Frankfurt and taught there until 2014. As a visiting professor, he has served in Paris (American University), Lyon (Université Lumière), Valdivia (UACh), Mexico (ITAM), Perth (UWA), Los Angeles (UCLA), Christchurch (UC) and Montréal (UdM).

Spahn held consultancies with numerous research institutes in Europe and overseas. He has worked with international organizations such as the International Monetary Fund, the World Bank, the United Nations, the United Nations Economic Commission for Latin America and the Caribbean, the European Commission, and the Council of Europe. For these institutions, he has advised over 70 governments worldwide. After his retirement in 2005, he served as Macro Fiscal Advisor to the Minister of Finance and Treasury of the Council of Ministers of Bosnia and Herzegovina. From 2008 to 2010 he was also a member of the Independent Commission on Funding and Finance for Wales in the United Kingdom.

During his time at the IMF, Spahn developed the concept for a tax to curb foreign exchange speculation (Spahn tax). Its proposal is a modification of the Tobin tax. Spahn has modified James Tobin's suggestion to have two tiers. There would be a low (perhaps even zero) rate for normal currency exchange and a higher normalization duty that would kick in during periods of high currency volatility. He also authored a study "On the feasibility of a Currency Transaction Tax" for the German Federal Ministry for Economic Cooperation and Development, which has gained widespread attention.

Spahn died in Darmstadt on 30 May 2025, at the age of 85.

== Writings (selection) ==
- Die Besteuerung der persönlichen Einkommen in der Bundesrepublik Deutschland, System und Modell, Berlin (Diss.), 1972.
- ”Ein Simulationsmodell für die personelle Einkommensbesteuerung in der BRD”, Konjunkturpolitik, Vol. 19, Nr. 2, 117–131 (1973).
- ”Simulating Long-Term Changes of Income Distribution within an Income Tax Model for West Germany”, Public Finance/Finances Publiques, Vol. 30, Nr. 2, 231–250 (1975).
- ”An Econometric Simulation Model of West Germany”, Empirical Economics, Vol. 1 Nr. 4, 251–288 (1979).
- ”Federal Grant Policy and State-Local Taxation” in State and Local Taxation, edited by R. L. Mathews, Australian National University Press, Canberra, 125–142 (1977).
- ”An Extension of the Tinbergen-Theil Framework to Problems of Federal Finance”, Rivista Internazionale di Scienze Economiche e Commerciali, Vol. 25, Nr. 3, 200–219 (1978).
- ”The Financial Behaviour of State and Local Governments in Australia”, Australian Economic Paper, (June 1979), 200–205 (1979).
- The Future of Community Finance, (Study for the Commission of the European Community) Brussels, Centre for European Policy Studies, CEPS Paper Nr. 30, Brussels (1986); with Luigi Spaventa, L. Koopmans, Pierre Salmon and Stephen Smith.
- ”La réforme fiscale aux Etats-Unis: Un modèle pour le monde industrialisé?, Revue Française de Finances Publiques, Vol. 24, 11–36 (1988).
- ”On the assignment of taxes in federal polities”, in Taxation and Federalism: Essays in Honour of Russell Mathews, edited by Geoffrey Brennan, Bhajan Grewal, Peter Groenewegen, Pergamon Press/ ANU Press, 148–165 (1988).
- ”Brauchen wir eine Haushaltsteuer?”, Wirtschaftsdienst, Bd. VII/1989, 345–351 (1989).
- ”L’impôt direct sur la consommation: Une utopie pour toujours?”, Revue Française de Finances Publiques, No. 29, 1990, 85–101 (1990).
- ”Financování federální vlády a vlád zemských—Volby vlastních daní, dělených daní a dotací při financováni zemských vlád—zkušenosti Nemecka”, Finance a úver (Praha), No. 8, 347–365 (1991).
- ”La Communauté Européenne et l’évolution des ses relations commerciales avec les pays tiers”, in: Raymond Barre et alii, éditeurs, ”L’Europe sans rivage” 40 ans après, Editions de l’Epargne, Paris, 41–49 (1991).
- Chancen und Risiken des Finanzplatzes Frankfurt im Gemeinsamen Markt— Entwicklungsaussichten des Finanzsektors in Hessen, HLT-Report-Nr. 311, HLT Gesellschaft für Forschung Planung Entwicklung mbH, Wiesbaden (1991; with Gerhard Bauer).
- ”Tax Harmonization or Tax Competition as Means to Integrate Western Europe”, Konjunkturpolitik, 37. Jg., H. ½, 1–44 (1991; with Helmut Kaiser).
- ”Consequences of EMU for fiscal federal relations in the Community and the financing of the Community budget”, European Economy, The Economics of Community Public Finance, Reports and Studies, Commission of the European Communities, Directorate-General for Economic and Financial Affairs, Vol. 5, 541–84 (1992).
- ”Taxation and Grants Policy in Multilevel Government: Options for the European Community”, Environment and Planning C: Government & Policy, Vol. 10, 37–50 (1992).
- ”The Case for EMU: A European View”, Konjunkturpolitik, Vol. 38, Nr. 6, pp. 291–315 (1992).
- ”The future of value-added taxation in the European Community”, Intereconomics, Vol. 27 (March/ April), 70–74 (1992).
- ”The tax dilemma of the married women in Germany”, Fiscal Studies, Vol. 13, No. 2, 22–47 (1992); with Helmut Kaiser and Thomas Kassella.
- ”The design of federal fiscal constitutions in theory and practice”, European Economy, The Economics of Community Public Finance, Reports and Studies, Commission of the European Communities, Directorate-General for Economic and Financial Affairs, Vol. 5, 63–100 (1993).
- ”Tendencias y direcciones futuras de la política fiscal europea: Cuestiones seleccionadas”, Zergak, Gaceta tributaria del país vasco, Vitoria-Gasteiz, (enero), 31–50 (1994); with Parthasarathi Shome.
- The Community Budget for an Economic and Monetary Union, Houndsmill, Basingstoke, Hampshire: Macmillan (1993).
- ”Local Taxation: Principles and Scope”, in Jayanta Roy (ed.), Macroeconomic Management and Fiscal Decentralization, EDI Seminar Series, The World Bank, Washington D.C., 221–232 (1995).
- ”The Tobin Tax and Exchange Rate Stability”, Finance and Development, Washington D.C. (June), 24–27 (1996).
- ”European Integration and the Theory of Fiscal Federations”, in Mario I. Blejer and Teresa Ter-Minassian, Macroeconomic Dimensions of Public Finance, Essays in Honor of Vito Tanzi, Routledge, London and New York, 110–130 (1997); with Richard Hemming.
- ”Brazil: Fiscal Federalism and Value Added Tax”, in: Parthasarathi Shome (ed.), Value Added Tax in India, Centax Publisher: New Delhi, 145-68 (1997); with Parthasarathi Shome.
- ”Decentralized Government and Macroeconomic Control”, in Horofumi Shibata and Toshihiro Ihori (Eds.), The Welfare State, Public Investment, and Growth, Selected Papers from the 53rd Congress of the International Institute of Public Finance, Springer: Tokyo, 129–150.
- Tax Modeling for Economies in Transition, Macmillan, Houndsmills, Basingstoke (1998); with Mark Pearson.
- “Globalization, Governance, and the Third World”, in Wilhelm Nölling, Karl Albrecht Schachtschneider und Joachim Starbatty (Hg.), Währungsunion und Weltwirtschaft, Festschrift für Wilhelm Hankel zum 70. Geburtstag, Lucius & Lucius, Stuttgart, 413-28 (1999).
- “Da controvérsia sobre a compensação financeira na Alemanha”, in Wilhelm Hofmeister and José Mário Brasiliense Carneiro (eds.), Federalismo na Alemanha e no Brasil, Fundação Konrad Adenauer, Série Debates no 22, Vol I (abril), São Paulo, 147-72 (2001).
- "Sobre la viabilitat d’un impost sobre les transaccions en divises“, FRC Revista de Debat Polític, De noves economies, Barcelona, hivern (5), 84–87 (2002).
- "The Feasibility of Taxing Foreign Exchange Transactions“, Tax Notes International, Special Reports, 15 July 2002, p. 311ff (2002).
- « Le maintien de l’équilibre fiscal dans une fédération : l’Allemagne », dans Pour un nouveau partage des moyens financiers au Canada, Recueil des textes soumis au Symposium international sur le déséquilibre fiscal, Rapport, Annexe 3, Commission sur le déséquilibre fiscal, Québec, Canada. (2002).
- Zur Durchführbarkeit einer Devisentransaktionssteuer (On the feasibility of a tax on foreign exchange transactions), Gutachten im Auftrag des Bundesministeriums für Wirtschaftliche Zusammenarbeit und Entwicklung, Bonn (January 2002).
- Position und Entwicklungsperspektiven des Finanzplatzes Frankfurt, Forschungs- und Entwicklungsgesell-schaft Hessen mbH, FEH-Report Nr. 645, Wiesbaden (2002); with Uwe van den Busch.
- "Consensus Democracy and Interjurisdictional Fiscal Solidarity in Germany“, in Ehtisham Ahmad, and Vito Tanzi (eds.), Managing Fiscal Decentralization, Routledge Studies in the Modern World Economy, London and New York, 2002, pp. 122–143 (2002); with Oliver Franz.
- "Contract Federalism“, International Advances in Economic Research, Vol. 8, No. 2 (2002); with Oliver Franz.
- "The Marshall Plan: Searching for 'Creative Peace’ Then and Now“, John Agnew and J. Nicholas Entrikin (eds.), The Marshall Plan Today: Model and Metaphor, Routledge, London and New York, pp. 191–213 (2004).
- "Contract Federalism“, Handbook on Fiscal Federalism edited by Ehtisham Ahmad und Giorgio Brosio, E. Elgar, Cheltenham, pp. 182–197 (2006).
- "Equity and efficiency aspects of interagency transfers in a multi-government framework“, in: Robin Boadway and Anwar Shah (eds.) Intergovernmental Fiscal Transfers: Principles and Practice, Public Sector Governance and Accountability Series, The World Bank, Washington D.C., pp. 75–106 (2007).
- "Intergovernmental Transfers: The Funding Rule and Mechanisms“, in: Jorge Martinez-Vazquez and Bob Searle (eds.), Fiscal Equalization: Challenges in the Design of Fiscal Equalization and Intergovernmental Transfers, New York: Springer, pp. 163–204 (2007).
- "Germany at the Junction Between Solidarity and Subsidiarity,“ in: Robert Ebel and Richard Bird (eds.), Fiscal Fragmentation in Decentralized Countries: Subsidiarity, Solidarity and Asymmetrie, Edward Elgar Publishing Ltd., pp. 89–113 (2007); with Jan Werner.
- "Managing Fiscal Conflicts“, in: Unity in Diversity: Learning from Each Other, Vol. 2, Emerging Issues in Fiscal Federalism, Edited by Ronal L. Watts and Rupak Chattopadhyay, Forum of Federations – Viva Books, New Delhi, pp. 51–76 (2008).

== See also ==
- Financial transaction tax
- Tobin tax
