= Rolf-Ernst Breuer =

German businessman and lawyer (1937–2024)

- Born: 3 November 1937; Bonn, Gau Cologne-Aachen, Germany
- Died: 22 May 2024 (aged 86); Frankfurt, Germany
- Education: University of Bonn (Doctorate in law)
- Occupations: Businessman; Jurist
- Organizations: Deutsche Bank; Goethe University Frankfurt

Rolf-Ernst Breuer (3 November 1937 – 22 May 2024) was a German businessman and lawyer. He spent most of his career at Deutsche Bank, of which he was CEO from 1997 to 2002 and president of the supervisory board from 2002 to 2006. During his leadership, Deutsche Bank acquired Bankers Trust, expanded its investment-banking operations in the United States and listed its shares on the New York Stock Exchange. Breuer also chaired the supervisory board of Deutche Börse and held leadership positions in German financial, cultural, and educational organizations, primarily at the Goethe University Frankfurt.

== Early life and education ==
Born in Bonn on 3 November 1937, he became an apprentice at the Mainz branch of Süddeutsche Bank, a successor institution of Deutsche Bank after World War II. He went into law and banking rather coincidentally, as he said in interview around his 80th birthday; his father had recommended chemistry, while he was interested in music and theatre direction, but realised that he was not talented enough for these fields. Breuer completed the apprenticeship at the Munich branch in 1958, then re-established as Deutsche Bank.

Breuer subsequently studied law in Lausanne, Munich and at the University of Bonn, where he earned a doctorate in law. After completing placements with banks in London and Paris, he returned to the Deutsche Bank in 1966.

== Career ==
Breuer became head of the stocks department at the Frankfurt headquarters in 1974. In 1997, Breuer succeeded Hilmar Kopper as spokesman of Deutsche Bank's management board, a position equivalent to chief executive. His appointment made him the bank's first chief whose background was principally in investment banking rather than traditional commercial lending. In 1999, Deutsche Bank bought the American Bankers Trust, initiating a global network. Breuer remained in the position until 2002, and was president of the supervisory board from 2002 to 2006. During his time at the helm of Deutsche Bank, he advanced the internationalization of the organization and developed activities on the capital market. In 2001, the bank's stocks were introduced at the New York Stock Exchange. The bank overall experienced substantial international expansion under his leadership. As chairman of Deutsche Börse, Breuer supported its proposed acquisition of the London Stock Exchange in 2005.

Breuer was interested in a consolidation of Germany as a financial marketplace, which earned him the nickname "Mr. Finanzplatz". He was president of the supervisory board of the Deutsche Börse, chairman of the council of the Frankfurt Stock Exchange, initiator and board member of the Aktionskreis Finanzplatz, and president of the Bundesverband deutscher Banken.

Breuer was active in positions of cultural and educational relevance. He was a member of the council of the Goethe University Frankfurt from 2001 to 2014, from 2005 as its speaker. In the position he worked towards a modernisation of the university. He was also a member of the board of trustees of both the university's Goethe Business School and the House of Finance. He worked in the supervisory board and as president of the financial committee of the Universitätsklinikum, and was on the board of directors of both the Gesellschaft für Kapitalmarktforschung and the Center of Financial Studies. He was president of the Kulturstiftung der Länder.

== Personal life ==
Breuer died on 22 May 2024, in Frankfurt at the age of 86, after a long illness.

== Awards ==
- 2002: Decoration of Honour for Services to the Republic of Austria
- 2020: Honorary senator of the Goethe University Frankfurt
