= Deutsche Bank Prize in Financial Economics =

The Deutsche Bank Prize in Financial Economics
- Awarded for: Influential contributions to research in the fields of finance and money and macroeconomics, and whose work has led to practice and policy-relevant results.
- Country: Germany, Frankfurt am Main
- Presented by: Center for Financial Studies
- First award: 2005
- Final award: 2015
- Website: www.db-prize.org

The Deutsche Bank Prize in Financial Economics honors renowned researchers who have made influential contributions to the fields of finance and money and macroeconomics, and whose work has led to practical and policy-relevant results. It was awarded biannually from 2005 to 2015 by the Center for Financial Studies (CFS), in partnership with Goethe University Frankfurt, and is sponsored by Deutsche Bank Donation Fund. The award carried an endowment of €50,000, which was donated by the Stiftungsfonds Deutsche Bank im Stifterverband für die Deutsche Wissenschaft.

== Prize winners ==
=== 2005 ===
Eugene F. Fama, Professor of Finance at the University of Chicago Booth School of Business, was the first winner of the prize. He was awarded for his fundamental contributions to financial economics, in particular, for developing and investigating the concept of market efficiency, which is now a cornerstone in the field of finance. The award was presented at Goethe University Frankfurt on 6 October 2005, preceded by an academic CFS symposium entitled “Market Efficiency Today”.

Fama is the joint recipient of the 2013 Sveriges Riksbank Prize in Economic Sciences in Memory of Alfred Nobel with Lars Peter Hansen of the University of Chicago and Robert J. Shiller of Yale University.

=== 2007 ===
Michael Woodford, Professor of Political Economy at Columbia University in New York, was awarded with the DB Prize 2007 for his fundamental contributions to the theory and practical analysis of monetary policy. Woodford has developed a theory of monetary macroeconomics that holds widespread appeal to academic researchers owing to its rigorous microeconomic foundations. Woodford has proved the immense practical value of his theory by analyzing the central role played by expectations and communication in the implementation of monetary policy.

The award ceremony was preceded by an international academic CFS symposium on "The Theory and Practice of Monetary Policy Today".

=== 2009 ===
Robert J. Shiller, Professor of Economics at Yale University, and Professor of Finance and Fellow at Yale School of Management, was awarded the 2009 prize for his contributions to the field of financial economics. Through his innovative work exploring the dynamics of asset prices, Robert Shiller has become a pioneer in the field of financial economics. His findings on the volatility of share prices, the occurrence of price bubbles and resultant crises, as well as on the distribution of macroeconomic risks are not only of great academic importance, they have also broken new ground in economic practice.

An international academic symposium titled “Financial Innovation and Economic Crisis” was held in connection with the award ceremony on 30 September 2009. Leading financial economists, including Nobel Prize laureate Robert C. Merton of the MIT Sloan School of Management and Otmar Issing, President of the Center for Financial Studies, discussed the topics explored in Robert Shiller's research.

Shiller is the joint recipient of the 2013 Sveriges Riksbank Prize in Economic Sciences in Memory of Alfred Nobel with Eugene F. Fama, University of Chicago Booth School of Business, and Lars Peter Hansen of the University of Chicago.

=== 2011 ===
Kenneth Rogoff, Professor of Economics and Professor of Public Policy at Harvard University, was awarded the 2011 prize for his pioneering contributions to the field of international finance and macroeconomics. Rogoff's works examine sovereign default and debt restructuring, exchange rate developments, global imbalances and the development of financial crises and are highly relevant for understanding and addressing global challenges. He has not only contributed pioneering work of great academic importance, he has also made his findings accessible to a broad public.

The award was presented during the international academic CFS symposium "Global Perspective on Financial Crisis" on 22 September 2011 at Goethe University Frankfurt. Leading financial economists, including the Governor of the Israeli central bank Stanley Fischer and Otmar Issing, President of the CFS, discussed Rogoff's works and their current political and economic relevance to the global financial and economic crisis.

=== 2013 ===
Raghuram G. Rajan, Governor of Reserve Bank of India, received the DB Prize 2013 for his highly influential contributions in a remarkably broad range of areas in Financial Economics, most important to the development of economies worldwide, ranging from the central role of banks in creating liquidity and the role of finance in economic growth to the nature of corporations and their financing. His work develops novel empirical and theoretical approaches with significant policy implications.
The award was presented during the international academic CFS symposium “Banking, Liquidity, and Monetary Policy” on 26 September 2013 at Goethe University Frankfurt, Germany. Leading academic economists, including Viral Acharya, Markus Brunnermeier and Luigi Zingales discussed Rajan's highly influential contributions in a broad range of research areas in financial economics. Policy panel members addressed topical policy issues relating to Rajan's work. They included European Central Bank Vice-President Vítor Constâncio, CFS President Otmar Issing and Governor of the Federal Reserve System Jeremy Stein.

=== 2015 ===
Stephen Ross, the Franco Modigliani Professor of Financial Economics and Professor of Finance at the MIT Sloan School of Management, is the recipient of the 2015 prize. The Jury chose Professor Ross for his groundwork and fundamental contributions to the analytical development of financial economics. For more than 25 years major models developed by him have marked the economic world. His models relate to the theory of asset pricing, the analysis of the term structure of interest rates, understanding option prices, and the basic structure of the principal-agent problem. The work of Stephen A. Ross has shaped today's thinking in financial innovation, practice, and policy.

The prize was officially presented as part of the academic symposium entitled “What Market Prices Tell Us” on 24 September 2015 at Goethe University Frankfurt. Leading financial economists will discuss Ross's work, its relevance and its contribution to the global financial industry and academic world. Plenary lectures about “Term Structure of Interest Rates” and “Historical Asset Prices” will be held by Nobel Laureate and Jury member Robert C. Merton and by K. Geert Rouwenhorst, Professor of Corporate Finance at Yale University. A panel of renowned economists will subsequently discuss the topic “Understanding Efficient Markets: Limits of Policy Influence”. The panel will include Eugene F. Fama, winner of the Deutsche Bank Prize 2005 and Nobel Laureate 2013, Martin F. Hellwig, Director of the Max Planck Institute for Research on Collective Goods, and Josef Zechner, CFS Jury member 2005 and Professor of Finance and Investments at WU Vienna University of Economics and Business.

== Nomination process ==
Every two years, around 4,000 professors and academics from each of the top 30 universities in the US, Europe, Latin America and the Asia-Pacific region are invited to submit entries and propose nominees for the prize. In addition, a total of more than 300 members of national banks, the European Central Bank, the Organisation for Economic Co-operation and Development (OECD), the Bank for International Settlements (BIS) and the World Bank will have the opportunity to suggest an academic as a potential prize winner.

== Jury ==
Nominations are assessed by an independent international Prize Jury. According to the Statutes of the Deutsche Bank Prize, the Jury comprises:

- Five renowned experts in economics and finance;
- The Directors of the Department of Finance and Department of Money and Macroeconomics at Goethe University Frankfurt or an expert nominated by them;
- A representative of Deutsche Bank;
- The Directors of the CFS.

== Jury members 2005–2015 ==
- Michael Binder, Goethe University Frankfurt, Germany
- Matthew Bishop, “The Economist”, USA
- Ricardo C. Caballero, Massachusetts Institute of Technology, USA
- Guillermo Calvo, Columbia University, USA
- David Folkerts-Landau, Deutsche Bank AG, Germany
- Günter Franke, University of Konstanz, Germany
- Nicola Fuchs-Schündeln, Goethe University Frankfurt, Germany
- Vitor Gaspar, State Minister of Finance, Portugal
- Luigi Guiso, European University Institute, Italy
- Michael Haliassos, CFS and Goethe University Frankfurt, Germany
- Charles Yuji Horioka, Osaka University, Japan
- Otmar Issing, President of the CFS, Germany
- Takatoshi Ito, University of Tokyo, Japan
- Nobuhiro Kiyotaki, Princeton University, USA
- Holger Kraft, Goethe University Frankfurt, Germany
- Jan Pieter Krahnen, CFS and Goethe University Frankfurt, Germany
- Patrick Lane, “The Economist”, UK
- Christian Laux, Vienna University of Economics and Business, Austria
- Raimond Maurer, Goethe University Frankfurt, Germany
- Thomas Mayer, Deutsche Bank AG, Germany
- Robert C. Merton, MIT Sloan School of Management, USA
- Lucrezia Reichlin, London Business School, UK
- Carmen M. Reinhart, Peterson Institute for International Economics, USA
- Hermann Remsperger, Goethe University Frankfurt, Germany
- Kenneth S. Rogoff, Harvard University, USA
- Reinhard H. Schmidt, Goethe University Frankfurt, Germany
- Klaus Schmidt-Hebbel, Pontifical Catholic University of Chile, Chile
- Robert J. Shiller, Yale University, USA
- René M. Stulz, Ohio State University, USA
- Marti G. Subrahmanyam, New York University, USA
- Lars E.O. Svensson, Sveriges Riksbank, Sweden
- Mark P. Taylor, University of Warwick, UK
- Raman Uppal, EDHEC Business School, UK
- Maria Vassalou, SAC Capital Advisors, LP, USA
- Norbert Walter, Deutsche Bank AG, Germany
- Uwe Walz, CFS and Goethe University Frankfurt, Germany
- Mirko Wiederholt, Goethe University Frankfurt, Germany
- Volker Wieland, Goethe University Frankfurt, Germany
- Josef Zechner, Vienna University of Economics and Business, Austria

== See also ==
- List of economics awards
