= Graduate School of Economics, Finance, and Management =

Coordinates: 50°07′37″N 08°39′54″E

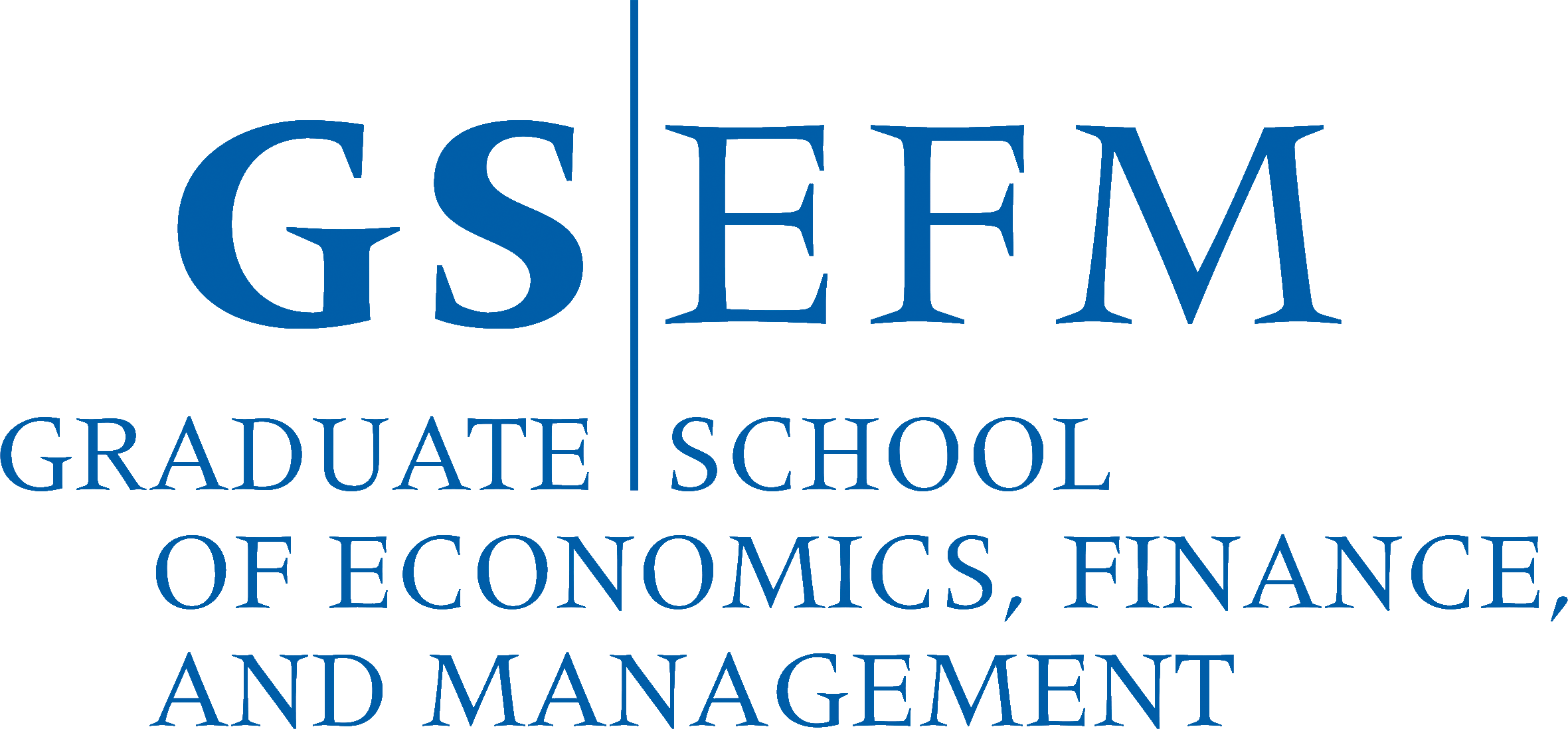
- Type: Public
- Established: 2008
- Dean: Michael Binder
- Academic staff: 58
- Location: Frankfurt am Main, Hesse, Germany
- Campus: Urban
- Address: Theodor-W.-Adorno-Platz 4; 60323 Frankfurt am Main; Germany
- Nickname: GSEFM
- Website: www.gsefm.eu

The Graduate School of Economics, Finance, and Management (GSEFM), based in Frankfurt am Main, Germany, is a graduate school offering quantitative and research-oriented graduate-level education programs. It was attended by 250 selected students in 2013.

== Structure ==
GSEFM is an alliance between Goethe University Frankfurt, Johannes Gutenberg University of Mainz and Technical University of Darmstadt. It is based in the House of Finance at Goethe University’s Campus Westend. Founded in 2008, GSEFM offers a range of doctoral and master programs. Part of the faculty comes from the AACSB-accredited Faculty of Economics and Business Administration of Goethe University. Graduates from the Ph.D. Programs officially obtain the title of "Philosophiae Doctor (Ph.D.)".

== PhD Programs ==
- PhD in Economics
- PhD in Finance
- Doctorate / PhD Program in Law and Economics
- PhD in Management
- PhD in Marketing
