= Hannah Elfner =

German physicist

- Born: Hannah Petersen; October 12, 1982 (age 43)
- Education: Goethe University Frankfurt
- Scientific career
- Workplaces: Duke University; Goethe University Frankfurt
- Thesis: An integrated Boltzmann + hydrodynamics approach to heavy ion collisions (2009)

Hannah Elfner (born Hannah Petersen; October 12, 1982) is a German physicist who is head of simulations at the Helmholtz Centre for Heavy Ion Research and professor of physics at the Goethe University Frankfurt. She was named the 2021 Alfons and Gertrud Kassel Foundation Scientist of the Year.

== Early life and education ==
Hannah Petersen was a physics student at the Goethe University Frankfurt. She graduated in 2006, and remained at Goethe for her doctoral research supported by Deutsche Telekom. Her doctoral research involved an integrated Boltzmann approach to the collisions of heavy ions. Heavy ion conditions give rise to a strongly interacting state matter known as the quark–gluon plasma, which is similar to the matter founded in the moments following the Big Bang. Within this phase, the plasma expands explosively at extremely high pressure. Petersen was amongst the first researchers to recognise that the pathway of these explosions was impacted by density and temperature. After earning her doctorate she joined Duke University as a Alexander von Humboldt Foundation Feodor Lynen fellow.

== Research and career ==
Elfner develops dynamical computation simulations to better understand high energy conditions and the quark–gluon plasma. She became interested in the influence of the initial and final states on the trajectory of heavy ion collisions. To quantitatively evaluate the impact of these boundary conditions, she adopted an event-by-event strategy that makes use of transport theory. She developed a hadronic transport approach known as SMASH (Simulating Many Accelerated Strongly-interacting Hadrons). SMASH is part of the National Science Foundation JETSCAPE framework. Her model predicted that the dynamics and viscosity of the plasma depends on the initial state and any quantum fluctuations.

In 2011, Elfner was appointed a visiting professor at Duke University where she was based in the quantum chromodynamics group. She decided to return to Germany because of the creation of the accelerator FAIR (Facility for Antiproton and Ion Research). She was appointed a Helmholtz Young Investigator in 2012, and a research fellow at the Frankfurt Institute for Advanced Studies the following year. She was one of the youngest researchers to ever be appointed professor in Germany.

From 2018 Elfner headed the group Transport and Experiment Simulations at Helmholtz Centre for Heavy Ion and is since 2021 the head of the Department Hot and Dense QCD Matter. She also coordinates the theory pillar at Helmholtz Centre for Heavy Ion.

== Awards and honors ==
- 2016 German Research Foundation Heinz Maier-Leibnitz-Prize
- 2018 Quark Matter Zimanyi Medal
- 2021 Alfons and Gertrud Kassel Foundation Scientist of the Year

== Selected publications ==
- Hannah Petersen; Jan Steinheimer; Gerhard Burau; Marcus Bleicher; Horst Stöcker (7 October 2008). "Fully integrated transport approach to heavy ion reactions with an intermediate hydrodynamic stage". Physical Review C, Nuclear Physics. 78 (4). arXiv:0806.1695. Bibcode:2008PhRvC..78d4901P. doi:10.1103/physrevc.78.044901. ISSN 0556-2813. Wikidata Q110442427.
- Guang-You Qin; Hannah Petersen; Steffen A. Bass; Berndt Müller (13 December 2010). "Translation of collision geometry fluctuations into momentum anisotropies in relativistic heavy-ion collisions". Physical Review C, Nuclear Physics. 82 (6). arXiv:1009.1847. Bibcode:2010PhRvC..82f4903Q. doi:10.1103/physrevc.82.064903. ISSN 0556-2813. Wikidata Q110446118.
- Hannah Petersen; Guang-You Qin; Steffen A. Bass; Berndt Müller (27 October 2010). "Triangular flow in event-by-event ideal hydrodynamics in Au+Au collisions at √sNN=200A GeV". Physical Review C, Nuclear Physics (in English and English). 82 (4). arXiv:1008.0625. Bibcode:2010PhRvC..82d1901P. doi:10.1103/physrevc.82.041901. ISSN 0556-2813. Wikidata Q110483433.
