= Holtham =

Holtham mat refer to:

- The deserted medieval village of Holtham in Lincolnshire
- Katie Holtham (born 9 April 1986), English footballer
- Nicholas Holtam (born 8 August 1954), a bishop of the Church of England.
- Holtham Commission, a UK commission tasked to investigate distribution of funds to the Welsh state
