= Frerichs =

Frerichs is a surname. It may refer to:

- Courtney Frerichs (born 1993), American middle-distance runner specializing in steeplechase
- Dieter Frerichs, director for two of the K1 funds a British Virgin Islands based hedge fund that collapsed
- Don Frerichs (1931–2019), American businessman and politician
- Friedrich Theodor von Frerichs (1819–1885), German pathologist
- Gerret Frerichs, German record producer of the trance group/solo project Humate
- Jan Frerichs (born 1973), German theologian, author and spiritual teacher
- Jason Frerichs (born 1984), American politician, state senator from South Dakota
- Mark Frerichs (born 1962), American civil engineer and former US Navy diver who disappeared in Afghanistan
- Mike Frerichs (born 1973), American politician, State Treasurer of Illinois
- Ralph R. Frerichs (born 1942), American epidemiologist
- Rembrandt Frerichs (born 1977), Dutch pianist and composer
