= Jan Pieter Krahnen =

Jan Pieter Krahnen (born 31 August 1954) is Professor for corporate finance at the Goethe-University Frankfurt and director of the Center for Financial Studies and the Research Center SAFE.

== Life ==
After completing an apprenticeship at the BHF-Bank, Krahnen studied business administration at the Goethe University Frankfurt where he earned a PhD in 1984. Four years later he received his postdoctoral lecture qualification (habilitation) from the Freie Universität Berlin. After staying at the University of Cologne and the Justus Liebig University Giessen, Krahnen returned to the Goethe University Frankfurt in 1995. At the same time he became director of the Center for Financial Studies.

== Research ==
Krahnen's research interests focus on banks, financial intermediaries, credit management and credit markets.

== Public influence ==
Between 2008 and 2012 Krahnen was a member of a German government expert group that drew up proposals on how to reform international financial markets. The Commission chaired by the former Chief economist of the European Central Bank, Otmar Issing, (thus also known as “Issing Commission”) published six reports. Krahnen is a member of the Group of Economic Advisors (GEA) of the European Securities and Markets Authority (ESMA) in Paris and a member of the Academic Advisory Board of the German Federal Ministry of Finance.

In February 2012, EU Commissioner Michel Barnier invited Krahnen to join a high-level expert group to examine possible reforms to the structure of the EU banking sector. Krahnen was the only German member of this group which was chaired by Erkki Liikanen, Governor of the Bank of Finland, and consisted of eleven people in total. On 2 October 2012 the group published their report.
