= Theodor Baums =

German legal scholar

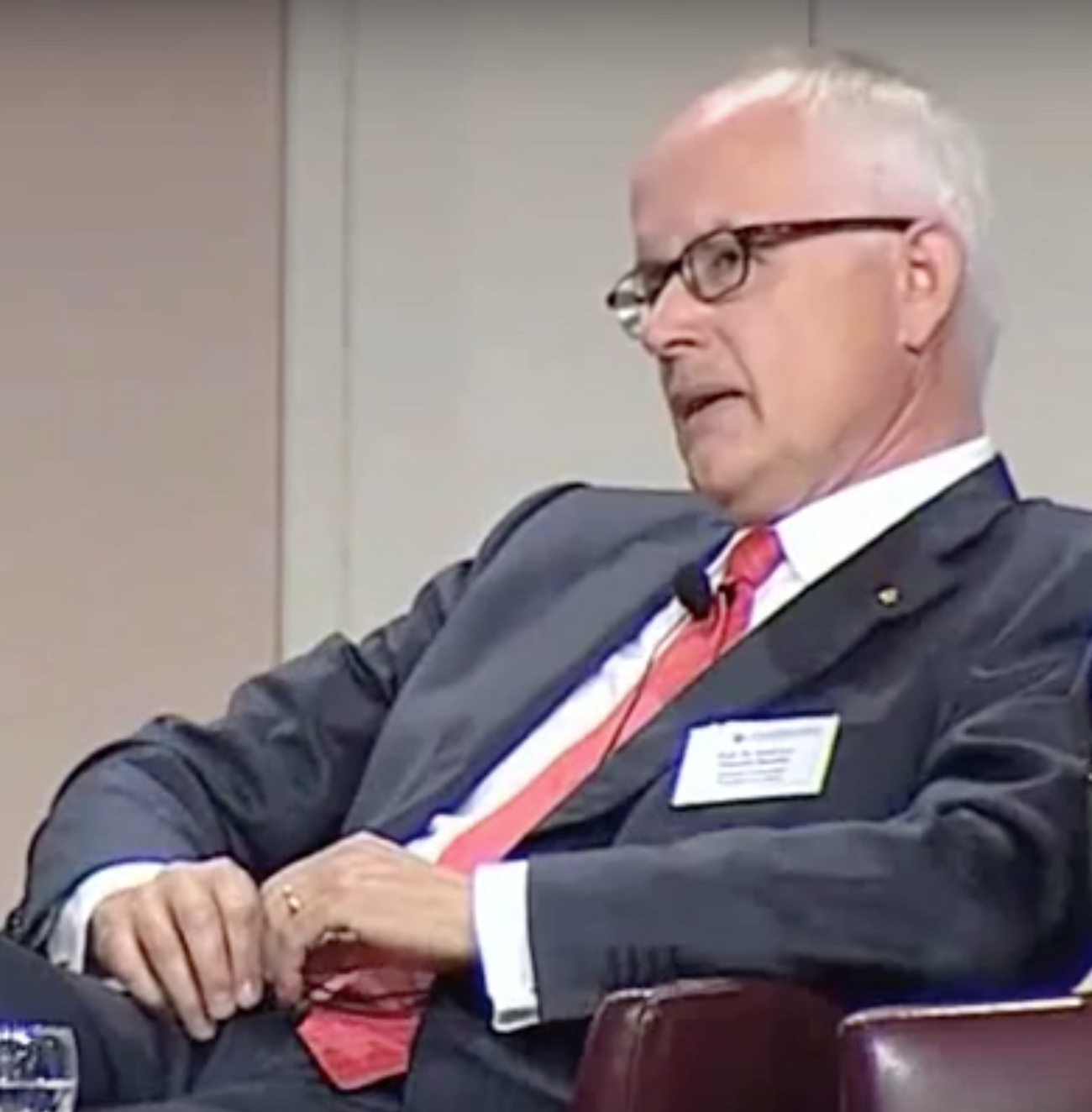
- Baums in 2010
- Born: 29 April 1947 (age 79); Birresborn, Germany
- Occupation: Legal scholar
- Awards: Order of Merit of the Federal Republic of Germany (2006)

Academic background
- Education: University of Bonn

Theodor Baums (born 29 April 1947 in Birresborn / Eifel, Germany) is a German legal scholar. He is professor emeritus of business law at the Goethe University Frankfurt and former advisor to the German federal government.

== Career ==
Theodor Baums studied law and Catholic theology at the University of Bonn and completed his legal studies in 1974 with his first state examination followed by the second in 1977. Until 1985 he was a research assistant at the Institute for Commercial and Business Law at the University of Bonn where he wrote his dissertation in 1980 and his postdoctoral thesis in 1985. He worked as visiting professor at U.C. Berkeley from 1990 to 1991, at the University of Vienna in 1992, at Stanford University in 1995, and at Columbia University in New York in 1999. From 2000 until 2006 he was the director of the Institute for Banking Law at the Johann Wolfgang Goethe University in Frankfurt/Main and has founded the Institute for Law and Finance where he now serves as a director. He has published more than 150 books and articles on corporations, civil and antitrust law.

He worked as an advisor to the World Bank and the OECD from 1992 to 1995. Baums was a member of the Federal Government's commission on takeover regulation from 1999 to 2000 under Chancellor Gerhard Schröder. Until July 2001, he served as the chairman of the Federal Government´s Commission on Corporate Governance and Company Law Reform. Chancellor Schröder appointed him Chairman of the Government Commission, whose recommendations were largely adopted and implemented by the legislator and the Government Commission for the Development of a German Corporate Governance Code. In 2007 he formed a commission with Paul Krüger Andersen from Aarhus School of Business and initiated a free-standing general company statute called EMCA (European Model Company Act) that can be enacted by European Union Member States.

Since 2017 he has been Of Counsel of the law firm SZA Schilling, Zutt and Anschuetz.

== Honours ==
Theodor Baums received the University Prize for his dissertation in 1980. In 2002, he was awarded an honorary doctorate by EBS University of Business and Law (Dr. rer. pol. h. c.). In 2005, the German Federal Minister of Justice acknowledged his commitment by awarding him the Euro Corporate Governance Leadership Award; in 2006, the German Federal President Horst Köhler awarded him the Order of Merit 1st class of the Federal Republic of Germany in 2006.

In 2008, the University of Luxembourg appointed him Professor Associé. In 2009, the Aarhus School of Business awarded him an honorary doctorate (Dr. jur. h. c.). In 2017 he was awarded the Dr. Michael Endres Prize of the Hertie School of Governance.

== Memberships ==
- Member of the Advisory Board of the Armenian General Benevolent Union Germany, the German chapter of the AGBU
- Member of the Advisory Board of the Federal Financial Supervisory Authority (BaFin)
- Advisor on corporate governance issues to the Executive Board of the Deutsche Bundesbank
- Member of the advisory board of the European Commission on company law
- Member of the European Model Company Law Group
- Fellow of the European Corporate Governance Institute (ECGI) in Brussels
