= Julio Rotemberg =

Argentine-American economist

- Born: September 26, 1953; Buenos Aires, Argentina
- Died: April 2, 2017 (aged 63); Newton, Massachusetts, USA

Academic background
- Education: Princeton University; California–Berkeley
- Doctoral advisor: Alan Blinder; William Hoban Branson

Academic work
- Discipline: Monetary economics
- School or tradition: New Keynesian economics
- Institutions: Harvard Business School; MIT Sloan School of Management
- Notable ideas: First New Keynesian DSGE model, especially on monopolistic competition
- Website: Information at IDEAS / RePEc

Julio Jacobo Rotemberg was an Argentine-American economist at Harvard Business School. He was known for his collaboration with Michael Woodford on the first New Keynesian DSGE model, especially on monopolistic competition. He was also known for an alternative model of sticky prices.

Rotemberg held a B.A. in economics (1975) from the University of California, Berkeley, and a Ph.D. in economics (1981) from Princeton University.

== Selected publications ==
- "Sticky Prices in the United States". Journal of Political Economy, University of Chicago Press. December 1982.
- "The New Keynesian Microfoundations". NBER Macroeconomics Annual 1987, Volume 2.
- "Human Relations in the Workplace". Journal of Political Economy. August 1994.
- Rotemberg and Garth Saloner. "A Supergame-Theoretic Model of Price Wars during Booms". American Economic Review. June 1986.
