= Alexander T. Sack =

German neuroscientist and cognitive psychologist

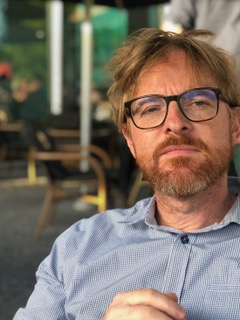
- Born: 9 October 1972 (age 54); Frankfurt am Main, Germany
- Occupations: Neuroscientist, Cognitive Psychologist, Academic and Researcher
- Awards: Fellow, The German Academic Scholarship Foundation; Fellow, Alzheimer Research Initiative; Fulbright Scholar; VENI-VIDI-VICI Laureate

Academic background
- Education: B.Sc. in Psychology; M.Sc. in Psychology; PhD in Natural Sciences
- Alma mater: Frankfurt University, Germany

Alexander Thomas Sack (born 9 October 1972) is a German neuroscientist and cognitive psychologist. He is currently appointed as a full professor and chair of applied cognitive neuroscience at the Faculty of Psychology and Neuroscience at Maastricht University. He is also co-founder and board member of the Dutch-Flemish Brain Stimulation Foundation, director of the International Clinical TMS Certification Course, co-director of the Center for Integrative Neuroscience (CIN) and the Scientific Director of the Transcranial Brain Stimulation Policlinic at Maastricht University Medical Centre.

Sack's research interests mainly surround brain stimulation and applied cognitive neuroscience. He specializes in noninvasive brain stimulation, fundamental and applied cognitive neuroscience, and clinical brain research.

Sack was Fellow of The German Academic Scholarship Foundation and a Fellow of the Alzheimer Research Initiative. He has been a member of The Young Academy of the Royal Netherlands Academy of Arts and Sciences (KNAW), and The Young Academy of Europe (YAE).

== Education ==
He studied Psychology and Neuroscience and completed his bachelor's degree in Psychology in 1995 at Johann Wolfgang Goethe University in Frankfurt am Main, where he also received his master's degree in 2000. He received his PhD in Neuroscience in 2003.

== Career ==
Sack was admitted to the doctoral program at Frankfurt University in 2000, supported by the Studienstiftung des Deutschen Volkes (The German Academic Scholarship Foundation). He completed his PhD in Neuroscience in 2003. He has been the Principal Investigator and Head of Research Section "Brain Stimulation and Cognition" at the Maastricht Brain Imaging Centre (M-BIC) since 2005. In 2009, he was appointed chairman and program director of the international and interfaculty Research Master in Cognitive and Clinical Neuroscience at Maastricht University. In 2015, he co-founded and chaired the Dutch-Flemish Brain Stimulation Foundation. He served as the Head of Department of Cognitive Neuroscience at Maastricht University from 2015 to 2016, after which he was appointed as Vice Dean Research at the Faculty of Psychology and Neuroscience at Maastricht University from 2016 to 2020. Since 2017, he has also been co-director of the Center for Integrative Neuroscience (CIN) there.

Sack's academic appointments at Maastricht University include his Assistant Professorship at the Department of Cognitive Neuroscience from 2005 to 2008, after which he was appointed as an Associate Professor of Cognition and Brain Plasticity until 2011. Since then, he has been a Full Professor of Brain Stimulation and Applied Cognitive Neuroscience at the Faculty of Psychology and Neuroscience at Maastricht University. Apart from Maastricht University, he has been a Visiting Professor at the Department of Experimental Biomedicine and Clinical Neurosciences, Palermo University, Italy since 2015.

== Research ==
Sack is a pioneer and influential leader in brain stimulation and cognitive neuroscience research. He contributed to uncovering the brain dynamics underlying human cognition by combining and developing noninvasive brain imaging and brain stimulation techniques. As a principal investigator of "Brain Stimulation and Cognition" at the Maastricht Brain Imaging Centre, his research mainly focusses on the neurobiological and psychological principles underlying attention, learning, memory, and cognitive control. His scientific approach is characterized by combining various brain research techniques, including psychophysics, eye-tracking, functional Magnetic Resonance Imaging (fMRI), Electroencephalography (EEG), Transcranial Brain Stimulation, especially Transcranial Magnetic Stimulation (TMS) and Transcranial Electric Stimulation (TES, including TDCS and TACS). Along with his team, he spearheaded the development of simultaneously implemented TMS-fMRI-EEG during cognitive behavior allowing the application of brain-stimulation while recording the individual brain network responses (fMRI) and oscillatory brain states (EEG) of cognitively engaged participants.

=== Multimodal brain stimulation and brain imaging ===
Sack showed that direct and precise monitoring of casual dependencies among oscillatory states and signal propagation throughout cortico-subcortical networks is enabled by concurrent TMS-EEG-fMRI which provides a promising noninvasive avenue of subject-specific network research into dynamic cognitive circuits and their dysfunction. His innovative approach enables the direct and noninvasive probing of brain-state dependent signal propagation within specific brain-wide functional networks and to study how temporal (oscillations) and spatial (brain-wide networks) coding dynamics interrelate. In an earlier combined TMS-fMRI study, he applied transcranial magnetic stimulation (TMS) to parietal cortices during concurrent functional magnetic resonance imaging (fMRI) and while participants were executing different visuospatial tasks. The results support the idea that visuospatial deficits following parietal damage are caused by a perturbation of activity across a specific frontoparietal network with right hemispheric dominance. The research also shows that concurrent fMRI and magnetic brain stimulation during task execution allows to identify and visualize networks of brain areas that are functionally related to specific cognitive processes.

In a related theoretical contribution, Sack describes different approaches of combining TMS with functional neuroimaging techniques along with shortcoming of TMS. After a critical analysis of the resulting conceptual and methodological limitations that the investigation of functional brain behavior relationships still must face, he argued that some, but not all of the methodological limitations of TMS could be overcome by combination with functional neuroimaging.

=== Flexible cognition and neural oscillations ===
Sack proposed that oscillations underlie communication between cognitive brain regions, enabling the flexible configuration of meaningful brain networks depending on cognitive demands. He also revised the functional role of the dorsal attention network (DAN), proposing that this specific network supports a very basic cognitive mechanism, being the neural source of attentional biasing signals that enhance, maintain and reactivate representations in (especially perceptual) brain modules to enable these various cognitive processes. The DAN thus acts as a critical hub in the flexible cognitive systems of the brain, indicating its overarching role in cognition.

=== Cognitive enhancement ===
Sack revealed that selective attention can be enhanced in healthy volunteers by applying personalized oscillatory-based transcranial brain stimulation. Sack and his team combined EEG with transcranial alternating current stimulation (EEG-tACS) to entrain the individual power (amplitude) of alpha oscillatory activity in one hemisphere of the brain. Importantly, this EEG-based tACS intervention not only significantly increased lateralized alpha oscillations as validated by EEG, but also significantly improved the ability of healthy participants to focus, detect, and discriminate stimuli in one specific hemifield, boosting selective spatial attention. The cognitive performance was significantly better as compared to no brain stimulation, showing that transcranial electric brain stimulation can lead to cognitive enhancements.

In the field of memory, Sack discovered that storing multiple items in working memory is brought about by clustering these different items along different oscillatory phases. Sack could show that this type of oscillatory sorting scheme within working memory is indeed functionally relevant for behavioral performances. Sack further showed that theta and alpha phase biases near-boundary item categorization responses to one category or the other and that participants with stronger oscillatory clustering in the theta range showed a sharper discrimination performance between item categories. These findings of behaviorally-relevant functional phase-ordering represented a milestone in unravelling the behavioral relevance of so far primarily theoretical accounts of phase-coded oscillatory ordering. The repetitive nature of oscillations ensures that each item can be refreshed at its own phase and thereby maintained.

Sack also decoded distributed occipito-parietal EEG signals with a linear classifier during a working memory retention interval, while using a sensory impulse stimulus to boost the read-out of distributed neural activity related to the content held in working memory. This allowed Sack and his team to reveal that the content of memorized information during retention is modulated by the phase of ongoing oscillations in the theta/alpha range, and, importantly, that memory performance is modulated by the phase at which the impulse stimulus was presented. He discovered that the intervention of presenting the impulse stimulus during phases of high memory content enhanced working memory performance in healthy volunteers. These studies of his lab show that the information held in memory is represented cyclically in posterior cortical regions and that modulation of this memory content influences memory performance. Collectively, these results represent empirical evidence in humans that working memory information is maximized within limited phase ranges, and that phase-selective stimulation can improve working memory, even in healthy young volunteers.

=== Brain plasticity ===
In a seminal Science publication, Sack introduced a novel TMS procedure that combines the respective advantages of creating a temporary virtual lesion through rTMS with the precise chronometric study offered by event-related triple-pulse TMS. This study showed that TMS-induced virtual lesions can evoke functional reorganizations, during which one part of the brain immediately compensates for activity disruptions in another brain region by taking over its specific cognitive function during task execution, revealing the highly dynamic properties of the human brain. This showed the enormous capacity, adaptivity, and flexibility of the human brain to compensate for any malfunction and to reorganize neural networks to maintain or regain functionality.

== Awards and honors ==
- Fellow, The German Academic Scholarship Foundation
- Fellow, Alzheimer Research Initiative
- 2012 – Member, DJA within the Royal Netherlands Academy of Arts and Sciences (KNAW)
- 2013 – Member, The Young Academy of Europe (YAE)
- Fulbright Scholar

== Bibliography ==
- Reithler, J., Peters, J. C., & Sack, A. T. (2011). Multimodal transcranial magnetic stimulation: using concurrent neuroimaging to reveal the neural network dynamics of noninvasive brain stimulation. Progress in neurobiology, 94(2), 149–165.
- Duecker, F., Formisano, E., & Sack, A. T. (2013). Hemispheric differences in the voluntary control of spatial attention: direct evidence for a right-hemispheric dominance within frontal cortex. Journal of Cognitive Neuroscience, 25(8), 1332–1342.
- Lückmann, H. C., Jacobs, H. I., & Sack, A. T. (2014). The cross-functional role of frontoparietal regions in cognition: internal attention as the overarching mechanism. Progress in neurobiology, 116, 66–86.
- Ten Oever, S., & Sack, A. T. (2015). Oscillatory phase shapes syllable perception. Proceedings of the National Academy of Sciences, 112(52), 15833–15837.
- Schilberg, L., Engelen, T., Ten Oever, S., Schuhmann, T., De Gelder, B., de Graaf, T. A., & Sack, A. T. (2018). Phase of beta-frequency tACS over primary motor cortex modulates corticospinal excitability. Cortex, 103, 142–152.
- Ten Oever, S., De Weerd, P., & Sack, A. T. (2020). Phase-dependent amplification of working memory content and performance. Nature communications, 11(1), 1–8.
- Peters, J. C., Reithler, J., Graaf, T. A. D., Schuhmann, T., Goebel, R., & Sack, A. T. (2020). Concurrent human TMS-EEG-fMRI enables monitoring of oscillatory brain state-dependent gating of cortico-subcortical network activity. Communications biology, 3(1), 1–11.
- Gallotto, S., Duecker, F., Ten Oever, S., Schuhmann, T., De Graaf, T. A., & Sack, A. T. (2020). Relating alpha power modulations to competing visuospatial attention theories. NeuroImage, 207, 116429.
- Ten Oever, S., Sack, A. T., Oehrn, C. R., & Axmacher, N. (2021). An engram of intentionally forgotten information. Nature communications, 12(1), 1–14.
- Veniero, D., Gross, J., Morand, S., Duecker, F., Sack, A. T., & Thut, G. (2021). Top-down control of visual cortex by the frontal eye fields through oscillatory realignment. Nature communications, 12(1), 1–13.
- Voetterl, Helena T. S.; Sack, Alexander T.; Olbrich, Sebastian; Stuiver, Sven; Rouwhorst, Renee; Prentice, Amourie; Pizzagalli, Diego A.; van der Vinne, Nikita; van Waarde, Jeroen A.; Brunovsky, Martin; van Oostrom, Iris; Reitsma, Ben; Fekkes, Johan; van Dijk, Hanneke; Arns, Martijn (16 November 2023). "Alpha peak frequency-based Brainmarker-I as a method to stratify to pharmacotherapy and brain stimulation treatments in depression". Nature Mental Health. 1 (12): 1023–1032. doi:10.1038/s44220-023-00160-7.
