= Independent Commission on Funding and Finance for Wales =

Defunct Welsh Government commission

The Independent Commission on Funding and Finance for Wales, also known as The Holtham Commission, was established by Rhodri Morgan (First Minister for Wales), Ieuan Wyn Jones (Deputy First Minister for Wales) and Andrew Davies (Minister for Finance and Public Service Delivery), of the Welsh Assembly Government. The establishment of the Commission was a commitment in the One Wales coalition agreement between Labour and Plaid Cymru in June 2007. Based in Cathays Park, Cardiff, the Commission completed its work in July 2010, publishing its findings in a final report: Fairness and accountability: a new funding settlement for Wales.

== Remit ==
The remit of the Commission was to look at the pros and cons of the present formula-based approach to the distribution of public expenditure resources to the Welsh Assembly Government; and identify possible alternative funding mechanisms including the scope for the Welsh Assembly Government to have tax varying powers as well as greater powers to borrow.

== Members ==
The Commission comprised:

- Gerald Holtham (Chair), Managing Partner of Cadwyn Capital LLP and a visiting professor at Cardiff Business School.
- David Miles, Member of the Bank of England's Monetary Policy Committee and visiting Professor of Financial Economics at Imperial College London.
- Paul Bernd Spahn, Professor Emeritus of Goethe University, Frankfurt am Main, Germany, and macro fiscal advisor to governments across the world.

== Findings and recommendations ==
The Commission began its work in autumn 2008 and published its first report in July 2009. In its first report, the Commission concluded that the Barnett Formula lacked any objective justification and had survived for reasons of political and administrative convenience. The Commission argued that the formula has caused relative funding per capita for devolved activities in Wales to converge towards the average level of funding in England (the "Barnett squeeze") despite relatively higher Welsh needs. The Commission recommended that in the future funding arrangements for Wales should be based on relative needs. As an interim measure, it recommended a modification to the existing formula that would place a "floor" under the block grant, preventing any further convergence towards the average English level of funding per capita.

In its final report, published in July 2010, the Commission recommended that:

- the Assembly Government should pursue the introduction of a needs-based formula for determining the Welsh block grant;
- the Assembly Government should acquire limited powers to vary income tax rates in Wales;
- the Assembly Government should seek a discussion with the UK Government about the feasibility of devolving corporation tax;
- stamp duty should be devolved to Wales;
- capital gains tax on property and land should be devolved to Wales, if the administrative costs are not prohibitive;
- the Assembly Government should consider the reform of Council Tax;
- local authorities should be given discretion to levy a higher council tax on second homes;
- landfill tax, air passenger duty and aggregates levy should be devolved to Wales if deemed useful;
- a procedure should be created to enable Parliament to confer power on the National Assembly to introduce new taxes in Wales when requested; and,
- the Assembly Government should receive limited powers to borrow to finance capital expenditure;

== Reception ==
Public Finance magazine reported that the Holtham Commission's final report was welcomed by Labour, Conservative and Plaid Cymru politicians – although Welsh Business and Budget Minister Jane Hutt was said to have given a more "muted" response to Holtham's recommendation that the Assembly Government should gain tax-varying powers. Former First Minister Rhodri Morgan opposed this idea, arguing that there was "no mandate" for tax-varying powers in the 1997 devolution referendum.

James Mitchell of Strathclyde University called the Holtham Commission's conclusions "remarkably bold... its proposals on income tax are, in important respects, bolder than those proposed by Calman" (the commission created in 2007 to review Scottish devolution). Mitchell noted that Holtham's critique of the Barnett formula, which he regards as advantageous to Scotland, "ought to be a wake-up call".

== See also ==
- Barnett Formula
- Commission on Scottish Devolution
