= Michael Woodford =

American economist (born 1955)

- Woodford in 1972
- Born: Michael Dean Woodford; 1955 (age 70–71); Massachusetts, U.S.

Academic background
- Education: University of Chicago (BA); Yale University (JD); Massachusetts Institute of Technology (PhD)
- Doctoral advisor: Timothy Kehoe

Academic work
- Discipline: Macroeconomics; Monetary policy
- School or tradition: New Keynesian economics
- Institutions: Columbia University
- Awards: Deutsche Bank Prize (2007); Erwin Plein Nemmers Prize in Economics (2024); Nobel Memorial Prize in Economic Sciences (2026)
- Website: Information at IDEAS / RePEc

Michael Dean Woodford (born 1955) is an American macroeconomist and monetary theorist who teaches at Columbia University. In 2026, he was awarded the Nobel Memorial Prize in Economic Sciences, along with Robert E. Hall.

== Academic career ==
Woodford was born in Massachusetts, in 1955. He graduated with a B.A. from the University of Chicago in 1977 and a J.D. from Yale Law School in 1980. He completed his Ph.D. in economics at MIT in 1983.

He began his teaching career at Columbia, and then taught at Chicago and Princeton before returning to Columbia to accept the John Bates Clark chair in 2004. He was awarded the John D. and Catherine T. MacArthur Foundation Prize Fellowship, which financed his research from 1981 to 1986. In 2007, he was awarded the Deutsche Bank Prize. In 2024, he received both the Erwin Plein Nemmers Prize in Economics and the BBVA Foundation Frontiers of Knowledge Award in the category of "Economics and Finance". In 2026, he was jointly awarded the Nobel Memorial Prize in Economic Sciences with Robert E. Hall "for microeconomic foundations of macroeconomic stabilisation."

== Theoretical contributions ==
Woodford's early research topics included sunspot equilibria and imperfect competition. He then worked on macroeconomic models with sticky prices. Working with Julio Rotemberg, he developed a model of the microfoundations of New Keynesian economics. He later used this framework to study topics related to monetary policy, including the fiscal theory of the price level, the effectiveness of monetary policy as consumers use more credit and less cash, and inflation targeting rules.

Woodford praised Knut Wicksell's advocacy of using the interest rate charged by central banks to maintain price stability. Woodford saw this as a remarkable insight, given that Wicksell was writing at a time when most monetary policy was based on the gold standard. Woodford calls his own framework 'neo-Wicksellian', and he titled his textbook on monetary policy in homage to Wicksell's work.

Much of Woodford's more recent research addresses the implications of bounded rationality and deviations from rational expectations for macroeconomic dynamics and monetary and fiscal policy.

== Interest and Prices ==
Woodford wrote an advanced textbook on monetary macroeconomics entitled Interest and Prices: Foundations of a Theory of Monetary Policy. The book was awarded the Deutsche Bank Prize in 2007; the award citation stated that it had "quickly become the standard reference for monetary theory and analysis among academic economists and their colleagues at central banks." The title Interest and Prices is a direct translation of Geldzins und Güterpreise, the title of a book published by Wicksell in German in 1898 and translated into English in 1923, as well as a reference to Don Patinkin's Money, Interest and Prices.
