= K1 fund =

Collapsed German hedge fund, 1996–2008

The K1 fund was a British Virgin Islands based hedge fund, initially marketed to and invested in by mainly German-based private investors, and latterly a series of global banks. With an estimated size of $378million/£249million and $1Bn under management, it collapsed in 2008. It is estimated by administrators Grant Thornton that liquidated funds able to be returned to investors are zero.

== History ==
After Dieter Frerichs relocated back to Germany from Spain in the early 1990s, he contacted his friend, qualified psychologist Helmut Kiener, to establish a financial partnership. Together they persuaded 10,000 small investors and banks to invest in an investment fund, founded in 1996 via the Kiener Company as the K1 fund. As neither Kiener nor Frerichs held suitable licenses to run the fund, they appointed ex-banker Michael Smolek to run the fund under the United Kingdom-registered private limited company Nitro Ltd from London.

The business prospered, and by 1999 Kiener claimed to have made 13 million Deutsche Marks for 100 investors. However, in 2001, after the German federal financial authority BaFin prohibited further investment in the fund, the company split into two shell companies named K1 and K1 Global Investments, based in the British Virgin Islands. However, actual control was via Frerichs's office in Mallorca, Spain, marketed to German customers via a telephone line sited in a friend's flat in Munich.

Although further warnings and prosecutions were issued by BaFin with regards the two K1 funds (K1 Global and K1 Invest, a hedge fund), investigations have shown that since 2006 K1 had subscribed a further 300 million euros of investment from both private German investors, as well as banks including Bear Stearns (acquired by JPMorgan Chase), BNP Paribas, Barclays and Hypo Alpe-Adria-Bank International. K1 claimed a return on its investments of 825% from 1996 to 2008.

=== Collapse and investigation ===
During the 2008 financial crisis, the K1 hedge fund collapsed. After their appointment in November 2009, liquidators Grant Thornton found that the two highly leveraged funds had a combined 421 million euros ($529 million) of liabilities, and projected that prospects for the money were poor. In 2012 aggrieved investors filed suits against Barclays Bank. They accused Barclays of not having communicated that the K1 funds were ponzi schemes when the funds still were solvent, although the bank knew better. An investigation was started by German federal authorities and BaFin, with the co-operation of the FBI, the United Kingdom's Financial Services Authority, and regulatory bodies in the British Virgin Islands, France, Hong Kong, Liechtenstein and Switzerland. Authorities presently suspect that much like the ponzi-schemes run by Bernie Madoff and R. Allen Stanford, that monies were serially transferred between overseas bank accounts to make the whole fund look bigger and more stable than it actually was.

Kiener was subsequently arrested and placed in detention in October 2009, while an Interpol-authorised arrest warrant was issued for Frerichs on February 23, 2010.

== Helmut Kiener ==
Helmut Kiener claims while studying at Johann Wolfgang Goethe University, his studies included “statistical chance theory,” which led to the K1 funds K1 Asset Allocation Method. Kiener claimed to have developed what K1 later described as a “semi-automatical allocation system” using statistics to help pick hedge-fund investments. He lived near Germany's financial centre, Frankfurt.

== Dieter Frerichs ==
Dieter Frerichs was director for two of the K1 funds controlled by the K1 group founded by Kiener. Following the collapse of K1 and issue of the Interpol arrest warrant, on April 13, 2010, Frerichs was arrested at his home in Palma, Mallorca, and later conditionally released. In May, prosecutors in Germany sought to question Frerichs, and obtained an extradition order. On July 3, Spanish police attempted to serve an extradition warrant on Frerichs close to his home in Mallorca. According to a police spokeswoman, Frerichs ran away from the police, and displayed a firearm. Police indicated that Frerichs fired the gun twice, shooting himself in the head. Police recovered him from the sea, and although taken by emergency ambulance to the Hospital Son Dureta in Palma, he died after a few hours. Members of Frerich's family initially alleged that police officers had shot at Frerichs, however, the New York Times and the Daily Telegraph reported the death as an "apparent suicide" and "suicide" respectively.
