= Frankfurt Institute for Advanced Studies =

Research institution in Frankfurt, Germany

Coordinates: 50°10′25.0″N 8°37′41.5″E

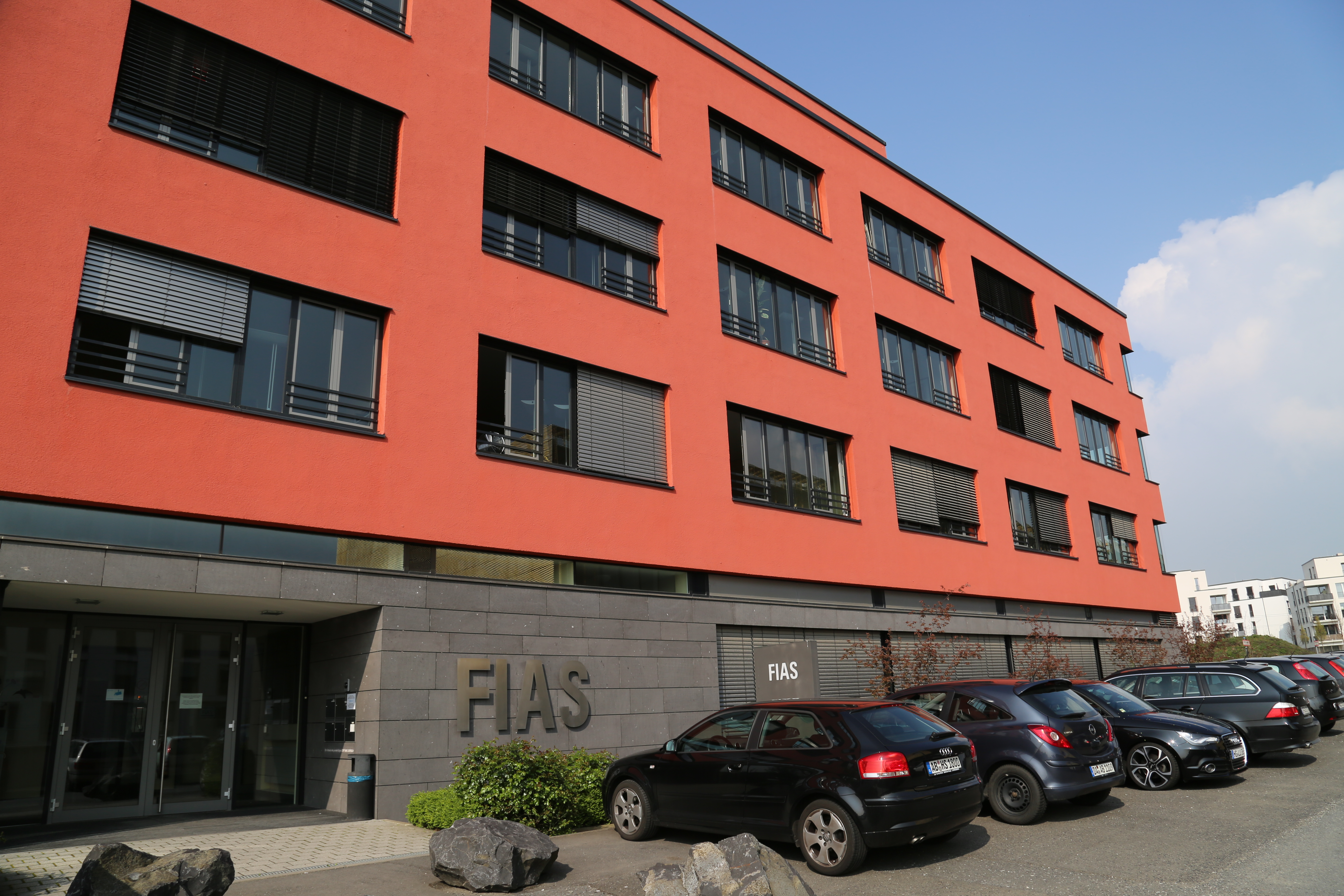
Frankfurt Institute for Advanced Studies Campus Riedberg

The Frankfurt Institute for Advanced Studies (FIAS) is a private-public institution for basic theoretical research in various areas of science focusing on interdisciplinary research. It is located in Frankfurt am Main, Germany, at its own home at the Frankfurt-Riedberg campus of the Goethe University. It was founded in 2003.

The Frankfurt Institute for Advanced Studies as a superstructure for basic research, brings together theorists from the disciplines of biology, chemistry, neuroscience, physics, mathematics and computer science in a common organizational and intellectual framework. It is an ambitious independent scientific institution while at the same time bundling research activities at the Johann Wolfgang Goethe University of Frankfurt am Main and neighboring research centers, such as the Center for Scientific Computing, the Center for Membrane Proteomics, the Center for Biomolecular Resonance, the Stern-Gerlach-Centre, the Gesellschaft für Schwerionenforschung (GSI) in Darmstadt, the Max Planck Institute of Biophysics, the Max Planck Institute of Brain Research, and the Max Planck Institute of Polymer Research in Mainz.

Professor Enrico Schleiff was chairman of the board of directors from 2018 to 2020, when he was succeeded by Volker Lindenstruth. Founding directors are Professor Walter Greiner and Wolf Singer.

Scientists from FIAS and from Goethe University join forces to educate graduate students in the Frankfurt International Graduate School for Science (FIGSS).
