= Institute for Monetary and Financial Stability =

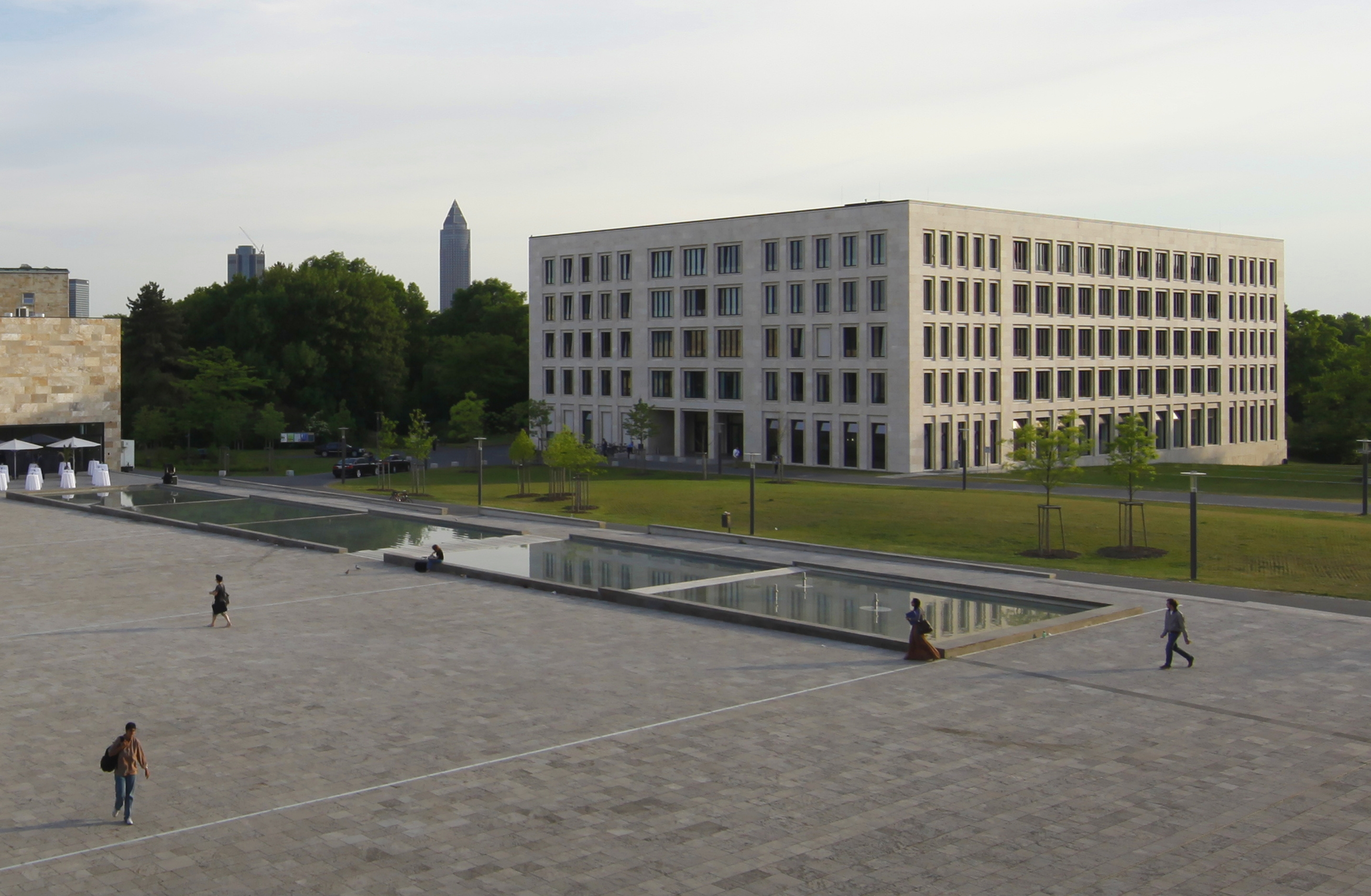
- House of Finance
- Abbreviation: IMFS
- Formation: 2007
- Founded at: Frankfurt
- Type: research center
- Purpose: central banks
- Headquarters: House of Finance
- Location: Frankfurt, Germany
- Parent organization: Goethe University Frankfurt
- Website: www.imfs-frankfurt.de

The Institute for Monetary and Financial Stability (IMFS) is an economics and legal research center at Goethe University Frankfurt with a focus on central banks. Its interdisciplinary research centers on the tasks, competencies, and powers of central banks in monetary policy, as well as regulation and financial supervision. Located in the House of Finance, which consolidates the university's economics activities, the institute was founded in 2007 to carry out the "Currency and Financial Stability" project and is co-financed by the Stiftung Geld und Währung (Foundation for Money and Currency). The Directorate comprises three core professorships and four additional professorships.

Another objective is the promotion of young researchers, particularly graduate education. The institute also facilitates knowledge transfer to credit institutions, central banks, and policymakers. Furthermore, the IMFS aims to raise public awareness of the importance of money stability and finances. Once a year, the IMFS organizes the international conference "The ECB and Its Watchers," where central bankers, financial market participants, and academics discuss current issues in monetary policy.

Volker Wieland is the managing director and holds the endowed professorship for Economics, specializing in Monetary Economics. His research focuses on monetary and fiscal policy, business cycles and macroeconomic models, inflation and deflation, learning behavior and economic dynamics, and numerical methods in macroeconomics.

Roland Broemel holds the professorship for Public Law, Economic and Monetary Law, Financial Market Regulation, and Legal Theory. His research also focuses on the legal aspects of digitalization and algorithm-based applications.

Alexander Meyer-Gohde holds the professorship for Financial Markets and Macroeconomics. His research focuses on the methodological foundations of macroeconomics and its interaction with financial markets through nonlinearity with regard to risk and uncertainty, as well as market frictions.
