= Center for Financial Studies =

Research institute in Frankfurt, Germany

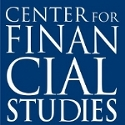
- Established: 1967
- Affiliations: Goethe University
- Location: Frankfurt am Main, Hesse, Germany; 50°7′38.65″N 8°39′56.2″E
- Website: gfk-cfs.de

The Center for Financial Studies (CFS; German: Gesellschaft für Kapitalmarktforschung) is an independent research institute located in the House of Finance on the campus of Goethe University Frankfurt. CFS conducts independent and internationally oriented research in the field of finance of relevance to the European financial sector. It serves as a forum for dialogue between academia, policy makers and the financial industry.

Axel A. Weber, former President of Deutsche Bundesbank and former Chairman of the Board of Directors of UBS Group AG, is the President and Chairman of the Board of Trustees. Otmar Issing is Honorary President. Andreas Hackethal and Rainer Klump are scientific directors. The managing director is Volker Brühl. The institute's sponsoring association is chaired by Jürgen Fitschen, former co-head of Deutsche Bank.

== Research ==
The Center for Financial Studies research program consists of research areas that are each managed by the directors. Guest researchers and fellows visit the institute regularly and collaborate on research projects with the academic staff at the CFS.

== Dialogue ==
The CFS aims to promote the dialogue between academia and the financial community by regularly organizing conferences, colloquia, academic forum discussions and specialist presentations on finance-related issues. It also participates in international research networks.

== CFS Index ==
Since 2007, the Center for Financial Studies has carried out a quarterly survey amongst leading executives in the German financial community. The purpose is to aggregate their evaluations and expectations in order to reflect the current business sentiment. In addition, special surveys on topical issues are held. The CFS Index has emerged from a cooperation of academics, business and politics.

== History ==
On the occasion of the 50th anniversary of Goethe University in 1964, banks, in particular private bankers, and the Deutsche Börse donated funds for the foundation of a new research institute. It was founded in 1967 under the name of the Institut für Kapitalmarktforschung (IFK) (Institute for Capital Market Research) and began its work in 1968. To this day, the institute is supported by the Gesellschaft für Kapitalmarktforschung (GfK) (Society for Capital Market Research), which was founded at the same time and whose more than 60 members mainly include banks, insurers, consulting and industrial companies. The Institute is financed by donations and membership fees. At the time of its foundation, it was the first research institute in Germany to focus exclusively on the problems of the capital market.

In 1996, the institute was given the additional name Centre for Financial Studies to reflect the increasingly international focus of its research activities. It has been operating under this name only since 2001. In 2005, the institute moved from premises at the Hessian State Central Bank to a building at Goethe University on the Westend campus, and in 2008 it moved into the newly built House of Finance on the Westend campus. From 2006 to July 2022, the former Chief Economist of the European Central Bank, Otmar Issing, was president of the CFS. He will be succeeded by Axel A. Weber. The directors of the Institut für Kapitalmarktforschung (IFK) and the Centre for Financial Studies included Karl Häuser, Bernd Rudolph, Axel A. Weber and Volker Wieland.

== Deutsche Bank Prize in Financial Economics ==
From 2005 to 2015, the CFS and Goethe University jointly awarded the Deutsche Bank Prize in Financial Economics, which is endowed with 50,000 Euros and honours outstanding contributions to the fields of finance, monetary economics or macroeconomics.
