= House of Finance =

Coordinates: 50.1269°N 8.6650°E

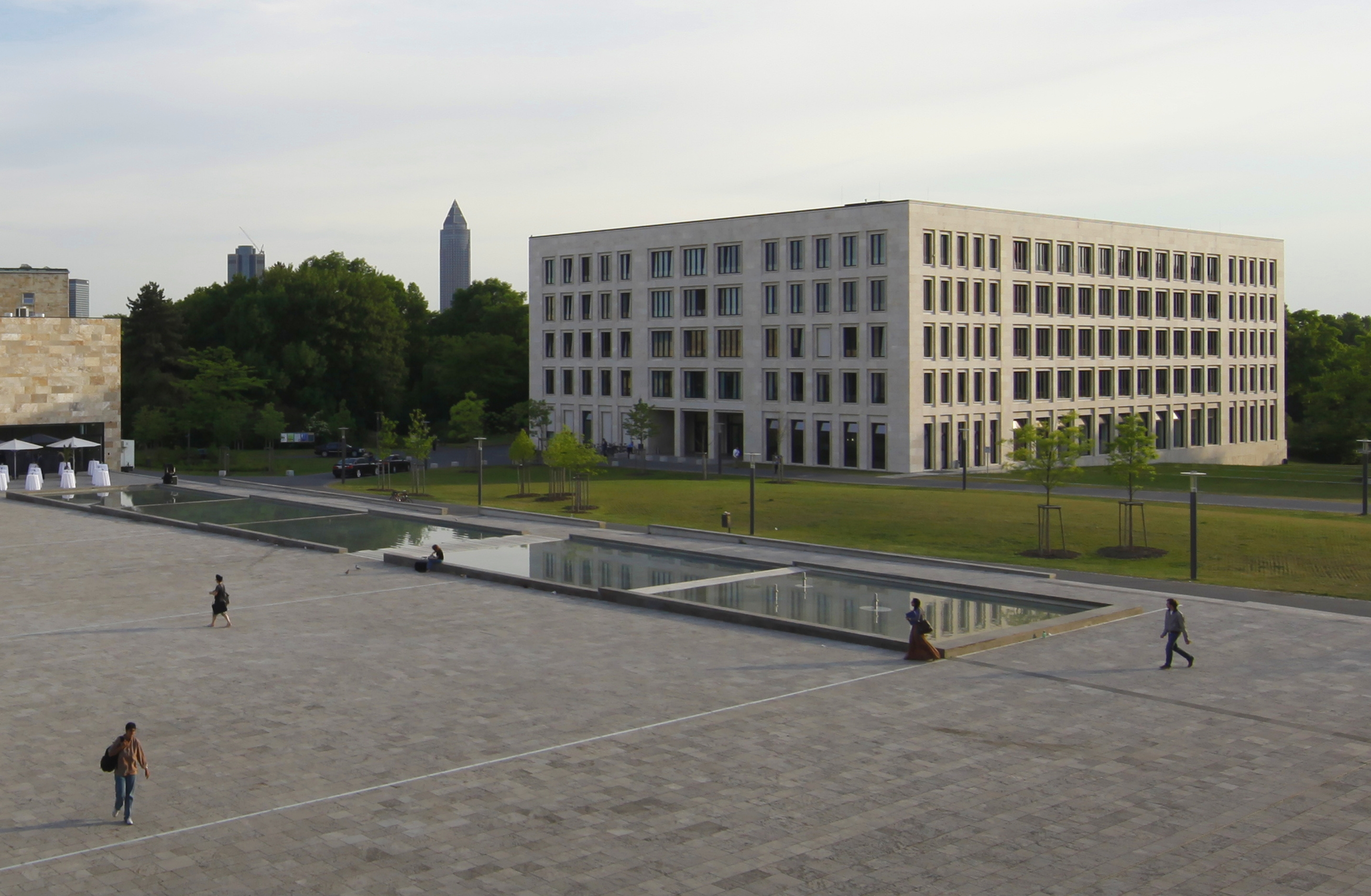
An image of The House of Finance, Frankfurt.

The House of Finance (HoF for short) brings together various interdisciplinary research and further education institutions from the Faculty of Law and the Faculty of Business and Economics at Goethe University. These include an institute of the Leibniz Association, private-law subsidiaries such as the Goethe Business School and the Institute for Law and Finance as well as alumni associations of the university.

== History and structure ==
Founded in 2008 and based on the Westend Campus in the Westend district of the city of Frankfurt am Main, the House of Finance is home to several research and further education institutes, both university-based and legally independent, in the fields of finance, financial law and insurance. Its first two Managing Directors were professor Dr Paul Bernd Spahn (2006-08) and professor Dr Wolfgang König (2008-22). They had a significant impact on the history of this institution. In addition to academic institutions, several alumni associations of Goethe University are also based in the House of Finance. These include, for example, the university-affiliated Goethe Finance Association and the university-independent Goethe Club

Goethe University founded the House of Finance gemeinnützige GmbH (non-profit LLC under German law) in 2009 and a House of Finance Foundation in March 2011, the proceeds of which are intended to benefit research, further education and policy transfer at the House of Finance. President of the board of trustees of the House of Finance is Otmar Issing. The non-profit LLC was liquidated in 2015.

The House of Finance building, which stands out in particular for its interior design, was built with funds from the state of Hesse, while some of the furnishings were subsidised by sponsors. The institutes working in the House of Finance are also partly funded by the university and partly by private sponsors. The Chairman of the Board of Trustees of the House of Finance is Axel A. Weber.

Overall, the House of Finance is an increasingly interdisciplinary centre at which around 200 academics, including around 40 professors, work. They belong to the university departments of Goethe University located in the House of Finance:

- Department of Finance
- Department of Money and Macroeconomics
- Department of Corporate and Financial Law
- Center for Financial Studies (CFS)
- Leibniz Institute for Financial Research SAFE
- E-Finance Lab Frankfurt am Main (EFL)
- Goethe Business School (GBS)
- Graduate School of Economics, Finance, and Management (GSEFM)
- Institute for Law and Finance (ILF)
- Institute for Monetary and Financial Stability (IMFS)
- International Center for Insurance Regulation (ICIR)

== Research and ranking ==
Many publications by associated scholars have appeared in top international journals, such as the American Economic Review, the Journal of Finance, the Journal of Financial Economics and the Journal of Banking and Finance, and also extend in many German legal commentaries and monographs.

According to the survey by the German business journal Handelsblatt in 2012, Goethe University's Business Administration Department ranks seventh among all comparable departments in German speaking countries. In 2013 the Department of Economics ranks seventh. According to the Handelsblatt ranking 2013 House of Finance researcher Roman Inderst is the best performing economic researcher in all German speaking countries.

== Courses of Study and Programs ==
As part of an alliance with the Goethe University, Johannes Gutenberg University in Mainz and Technical University of Darmstadt, the Graduate School of Economics, Finance, and Management (GSEFM) at the House of Finance runs structured PhD programs that enable graduates to engage in new fields of research and to pursue careers in academia.

The Goethe Business School (GBS) and the Institute for Law and Finance (ILF) offer education and training programs that combine an international outreach with a practical approach. Their objective is to mainstream state-of-the-art research findings in policy-making activities.

Within the House of Finance, the following programs are currently offered:

- Master in Money and Finance (MMF)
- Master of Laws in Finance (LL.M. Finance)
- MSQ Programs in Economics, Finance, Management, Marketing and Law and Economics
- Part-time Master in Finance
- Part-time Master in Pharma Business Administration (MBA)
- Ph.D. in Economics
- Ph.D. in Finance
- Ph.D. in Law and Economics of Money and Finance
- Ph.D. in Management
- Ph.D. in Marketing
- Open programs (Financial Risk Management, GBS evening courses, ILF Spring Course, Summer Schools)

== Knowledge Transfer ==
The House of Finance is committed to incorporating the latest research findings into policy-making activities. For this reason, the SAFE "Policy Center" in the House of Finance aims at disseminating research findings to decision makers in politics, regulation, and administration in Germany and Europe.

Furthermore, the House of Finance institutions organize a variety of events and forums that communicate know-how and facilitate exchanges of experience. The Presidential Lectures of the Center for Financial Studies along with the Distinguished Lectures of the Institute for Monetary and Financial Stability are examples of House of Finance’s knowledge transfer activities.

== Architecture ==
On 30 May 2008, the House of Finance relocated to a new building. Its new building is on the Westend campus of Goethe University. The building was designed by the architectural firm "Kleihues + Kleihues". The Westend campus is characterized by the I.G. Farben building by architect Hans Poelzig, whose external appearance is characterized by a perforated façade in the New Objectivity style and the extensive use of travertine and is therefore stylistically close to neoclassicism. In keeping with this, the House of Finance, like the other new buildings on the campus, also follows classicist stylistic principles. The front and side façades are strongly gridded and strictly axially symmetrical; they are each divided into three sections with building corners that are emphasized by narrower windows and by central bays that open outwards with larger windows. The window openings themselves are emphasized by profiled jambs. The windows and wall surfaces are coordinated in such a way as to achieve a continuous grid of joints in the natural stone cladding.

Inside, the building is characterized on the upper floors by individual offices and combined zones for scientists and students, in which both individual and communal use is possible. This made it possible to achieve a high density of usable space. Seminar rooms are located at the top of the building on the upper floors.

Upon entering the building, a spacious, naturally lit foyer opens up on the first floor, adjoining the lecture halls and seminar rooms as well as the information center - a reference library. The floor, walls and ceiling of the foyer echo the design grid of the entire building, which is inspired by Raphael's fresco The School of Athens, which is particularly evident in the floor design. The building also houses computer rooms on the first floor, a data room with Bloomberg terminals and a public café of the Frankfurt am Main Student Union (Studentenwerk Frankfurt am Main) named after the sponsor as Börsen-Zeitung-Bistro.

== Additional associations ==
Non-independent associations

The House of Finance is home to many different institutions. Most of them are academic research institutes and other institutions that are either directly linked to the university administration or are independent.

Among the most important and largest non-academic institutions within the House of Finance you can find the Goethe Finance Association which was founded by professors of the faculty of economics and business administration of the Goethe University. This organisation is rum mostly by professors of the Goethe University.

The department of economics and business administration, to which the House of Finance belongs, includes the most important institution, the Frankfurter Wirtschaftswissenachaftliche Gesellschaft (Frankfurt business and economics society) which is not formally based in the House of Finance but uses the building for events. This organisation is mostly run by alumni of the Goethe University.

The Goethe Money and Macro Association (GMMA) is an alumni association at the Faculty of Economics and Business Administration of Goethe University. Founded with the aim of promoting research and teaching in the fields of money and currency, GMMA offers its members a platform for enhanced interaction between academia and industry.

Independent associations

The Goethe Club, a universal student, staff and alumni club for each faculty run by its members, is based in the House of Finance. The Goethe Club is a neutral, independent and non-profit association for the promotion of education, culture and science and the associated international exchange and networking of all current and former members of Goethe University. Founded in 1997, it focuses on pluralistic further education and the application of all subjects in theory and practice in cooperation with institutions from all fields. The association offers a sustainable private and professional network, social and cultural activities, international contacts and exclusive career opportunities. In this way, the Goethe Club fosters the bond with Goethe University.
