= Goethe Business School =

- Type: charitable
- Established: 2004
- Affiliations: Goethe University of Frankfurt
- Location: Frankfurt am Main, Hesse, Germany
- Website: www.goethe-business-school.de

Goethe Business School gGmbH (GBS) is a subsidiary of Goethe University Frankfurt. Goethe Business School was founded in 2004[2] and, in close cooperation with the Faculty of Economics and Business Administration, offers and offers, in close cooperation with the Faculty of Economics and Business Administration, a wide range of education for executives and young professionals.

== Competence Clusters ==
GBS focuses on eight topics: Financial Technology Management, Risk Management & Regulation, Digital Transformation, Data Science, Sustainability, Entrepreneurship, Pharma, and Sports Management.

== Part-Time Master in Finance (MFIN) ==
The part-time Master in Finance offered by GBS targets working professionals, who want to qualify for a career in the financial sector. The program offers the possibility to specialize in either financial technology management or risk management and regulation, and can be completed within three semesters plus a Master's Thesis.

== Part-Time Master of Pharma Business Administration (MPBA) ==
The part-time Master of Pharma Business Administration offered by GBS targets professionals working in the pharmaceutical industry. It has been created by the Goethe Business School, the House of Pharma & Healthcare, the Faculty of Economics and Business Administration, and the Faculty of Biochemistry, Chemistry and Pharmacy of Goethe University Frankfurt. The program awards an M.B.A degree.

== Goethe MBA Digital Transformation | Data Science | Sustainability (GMBA) ==
The Goethe MBA is a part-time program offered by GBS, with specialization options in Digital Transformation, Data Science, and Sustainability. It is aimed at professionals with several years of work experience. GBS offers the program in cooperation with the Faculty of Economics and Business Administration. The program awards an M.B.A degree.

== Sports Management MBA (SMBA) ==
The part-time Sports Management MBA offered by GBS is designed in cooperation with Eintracht Frankfurt and is aimed at working professionals in the sports industry and related fields.

== Executive Education ==
GBS provides educational programs for executives and young professionals in the fields of Finance & Banking, Digital Transformation & Data Science, Sustainability & ESG, Pharma & Healthcare, and Management & Leadership.

== China Executive Education Center ==
The China Executive Education Center at GBS has a specific geographic focus, educating executives from several Chinese financial institutions on interdisciplinary management and financial topics, thereby connecting business leaders from China and Europe.

== Accreditation ==
All part-time programs are accredited by the Association to Advance Collegiate Schools of Business (AACSB) and the Accreditation System of Goethe University.

== Location ==
Goethe Business School is located at the House of Finance on Campus Westend of the Goethe University in Frankfurt am Main.
