= Institute for Law and Finance =

German graduate school

Coordinates: 50°07′39″N 8°39′56″E

- Type: Graduate School
- Established: 2002
- Dean: Prof. Dr. Andreas Cahn
- Students: around 50 LL.M. Finance students per year
- Location: Frankfurt, Hesse, Germany
- Campus: Campus Westend, Frankfurt am Main, Germany
- Website: www.ilf-frankfurt.de

The Institute for Law and Finance (ILF) is a graduate school which was established as a non-profit foundation in 2002 by Goethe University Frankfurt am Main. The ILF provides interdisciplinary training to lawyers, senior management and executives in Germany and worldwide and serves as a policy center in the legislative process by offering forums for discussions and exchanges between academia and practitioners.

The ILF offers the LL.M Finance and LL.M International Finance Degree Programs, Spring School on "Corporate Law in Practice" and Summer School on "Law of Banking and Capital Markets".

The executive director of the ILF is Andreas Cahn, Endowment Funds Commerzbank Professorship, Goethe University Frankfurt am Main. Theodor Baums, Professor of Civil, Corporate & Capital Markets Law, Goethe University Frankfurt and Manfred Wandt, Director, Institute for Insurance Law, Goethe University Frankfurt are ILF directors.

== Programs ==
=== LL.M. Finance Program ===
The ILF at Goethe University in Frankfurt am Main offers a one-year postgraduate program leading to a LL.M. in Finance (LL.M. Finance) for graduate students with a bachelor's degree in law, business, or economics. The courses are conducted in English language.

About 50 graduates are admitted annually for study. The program is aimed at students with a prior degree in law, business, or economics and who have an interest in combining theoretical knowledge with practical training in law and international finance.

The curriculum is interdisciplinary covering all aspects of international financial law with emphasis on the EU and the United States.

Since 2008, together with the Universities of Deusto, Tilburg, and Strasbourg, the ILF also offers the Erasmus Mundus „Master in Transnational Trade Law and Finance“, a Master's program which has received the approval of the European Union.

ILF students are fully enrolled members of Goethe University Frankfurt am Main, which confers the LL.M. Finance and LL.M. International Finance degrees.

=== Internships ===
The LL.M. Finance program incorporates a special four to six weeks' internship with public and private institutions which support the ILF. These institutions typically include leading international law firms, banks, international accounting firms, the European Central Bank, and Deutsche Bundesbank.

=== International Student Exchange Programs ===
The ILF maintains student exchange programs with Columbia Law School, FGV Direito Rio, and Amsterdam Business School.

=== LL.M. International Finance Program ===
In October 2014, a new LL.M. International Finance program for graduates holding a first degree in law, business or economics from Asia (especially mainland China, Hong Kong, Macau and Taiwan) was launched. The program offers interdisciplinary and practice-oriented training in the areas of international and European banking, securities and finance law to graduates from Asia.
