= Goethe University Frankfurt =

University in Frankfurt, Germany

- Johann Wolfgang Goethe-Universität Frankfurt am Main
- Former name: Königliche Universität zu Frankfurt am Main
- Type: Public
- Established: 18 October 1914 The Goethe University has roots dating back to 1484, the year in which the current "Johann Christian Senckenberg University Library" was founded.
- Affiliations: U15
- Budget: €715.3 million (2020)
- Chancellor: Albrecht Fester
- President: Enrico Schleiff
- Vice-president: Bernhard Brüne, Michael Huth, Christiane Thompson, Ulrich Schielein
- Faculty: 3,631.8 (FTE, 2020)
- Administrative staff: 2,082.9 (FTE, 2020)
- Students: 42,355 (2022)
- Undergraduates: 19,329 (2022)
- Postgraduates: 6,816 (2022)
- Doctoral students: 1,213 (2022)
- Other students: 5,940 (teacher education) (2022)
- Location: Campus Westend: Theodor-W.-Adorno-Platz 1, Frankfurt am Main, Hessen, 60323, Germany; 50°7′40″N 8°40′00″E
- Campus: Multiple sites
- Language: German, English
- Colours: Blue
- Website: www.goethe-university-frankfurt.de
- Location within Germany Location within Hesse

Goethe University Frankfurt (German: Johann Wolfgang Goethe-Universität Frankfurt am Main) is a public research university located in Frankfurt am Main, Hesse. It was founded in 1914 as a citizens' university, which means it was founded and funded by the wealthy and active liberal citizenry of Frankfurt. The original name in German was Universität Frankfurt am Main (University of Frankfurt am Main). In 1932, the university's name was extended in honour of one of the most famous native sons of Frankfurt, the poet, philosopher and writer/dramatist Johann Wolfgang von Goethe. The university currently has around 48,000 students, distributed across four major campuses within the city.

The university celebrated its 100th anniversary in 2014. The first female president of the university, Birgitta Wolff, was sworn into office in 2015, and was succeeded by Enrico Schleiff in 2021. 20 Nobel Prize winners have been affiliated with the university, including Max von Laue and Max Born. The university is also affiliated with 18 winners of the Gottfried Wilhelm Leibniz Prize.

Goethe University is part of the IT cluster Rhine-Main-Neckar. The Johannes Gutenberg University Mainz, the Goethe University Frankfurt and the Technische Universität Darmstadt together form the Rhine-Main-Universities (RMU).

== History ==
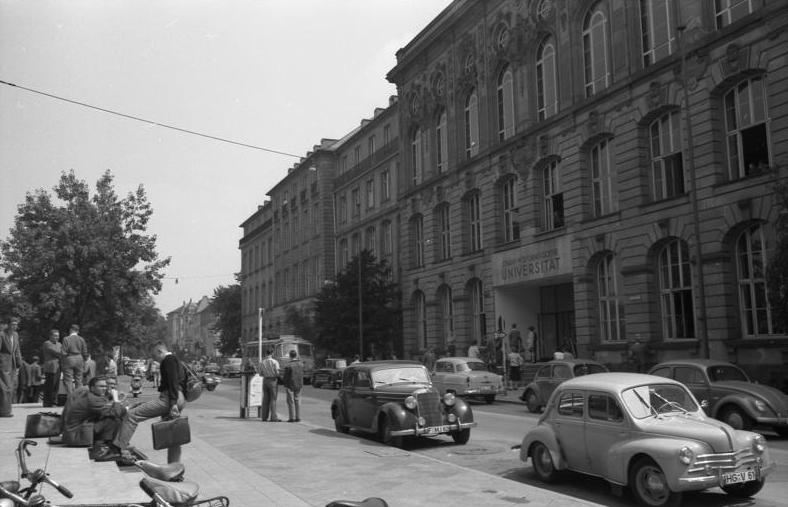
Campus Bockenheim (in 1958)

The historical roots of the university can be traced back as far as 1484, when a City Council Library was established with a bequest from the patrician Ludwig von Marburg. Merged with other collections, it was renamed City Library in 1668 and became the university library in 1914. Depending on the country, the date of foundation is recorded differently. According to Anglo-American calculations, the founding date of Goethe University would be 1484. In Germany, the date on which the right to award doctorates is granted is considered the founding year of a university.

The modern history of the University of Frankfurt can be dated to 28 September 1912, when the foundation contract for the "Königliche Universität zu Frankfurt am Main" (Royal University at Frankfurt on the Main) was signed at the Römer, Frankfurt's town hall. Royal permission for the university was granted on 10 June 1914, and the first enrollment of students began on 16 October 1914. Members of Frankfurt's Jewish community, including the Speyer family, Wilhelm Ralph Merton, and the industrialists Leo Gans and Arthur von Weinberg donated two thirds of the foundation capital of the University of Frankfurt.

The university has been best known historically for its Institute for Social Research (founded 1923), the institutional home of the Frankfurt School, a preeminent 20th-century school of philosophy and social thought. Some of the well-known scholars associated with this school include Theodor Adorno, Max Horkheimer, and Jürgen Habermas, as well as Herbert Marcuse, Erich Fromm, and Walter Benjamin. Other well-known scholars at the University of Frankfurt include the sociologist Karl Mannheim, the philosopher Hans-Georg Gadamer, the philosophers of religion Franz Rosenzweig, Martin Buber, and Paul Tillich, the psychologist Max Wertheimer, and the sociologist Norbert Elias. The University of Frankfurt has at times been considered liberal, or left-leaning, and has had a reputation for Jewish and Marxist (or even Jewish-Marxist) scholarship. During the Nazi period, "almost one third of its academics and many of its students were dismissed for racial and/or political reasons—more than at any other German university". The university also played a major part in the German student movement of 1968.

The university also has been influential in the natural sciences and medicine, with Nobel Prize winners including Max von Laue and Max Born, and breakthroughs such as the Stern–Gerlach experiment.

In recent years, the university has focused in particular on law, history, and economics, creating new institutes, such as the Institute for Law and Finance (ILF) and the Center for Financial Studies (CFS). One of the university's ambitions is to become Germany's leading university for finance and economics, given the school's proximity to one of Europe's financial centers. In cooperation with Duke University's Fuqua School of Business, the Goethe Business School offers an MBA program. Goethe University has established an international award for research in financial economics, the Deutsche Bank Prize in Financial Economics.

In February 2026, the Johann Christian Senckenberg University Library at Goethe University returned five Nazi-looted books to the Jewish Community of Frankfurt. This marked the first time the university restituted looted property directly to the local community. The books were identified through a provenance research project launched in 2020 and funded by the German Lost Art Foundation. Among the returned volumes were books belonging to Julius Blau, a prominent lawyer and former chairman of the Israelite Community, and his son Ernst Blau, a librarian who died in the Gurs concentration camp.

== Organization ==
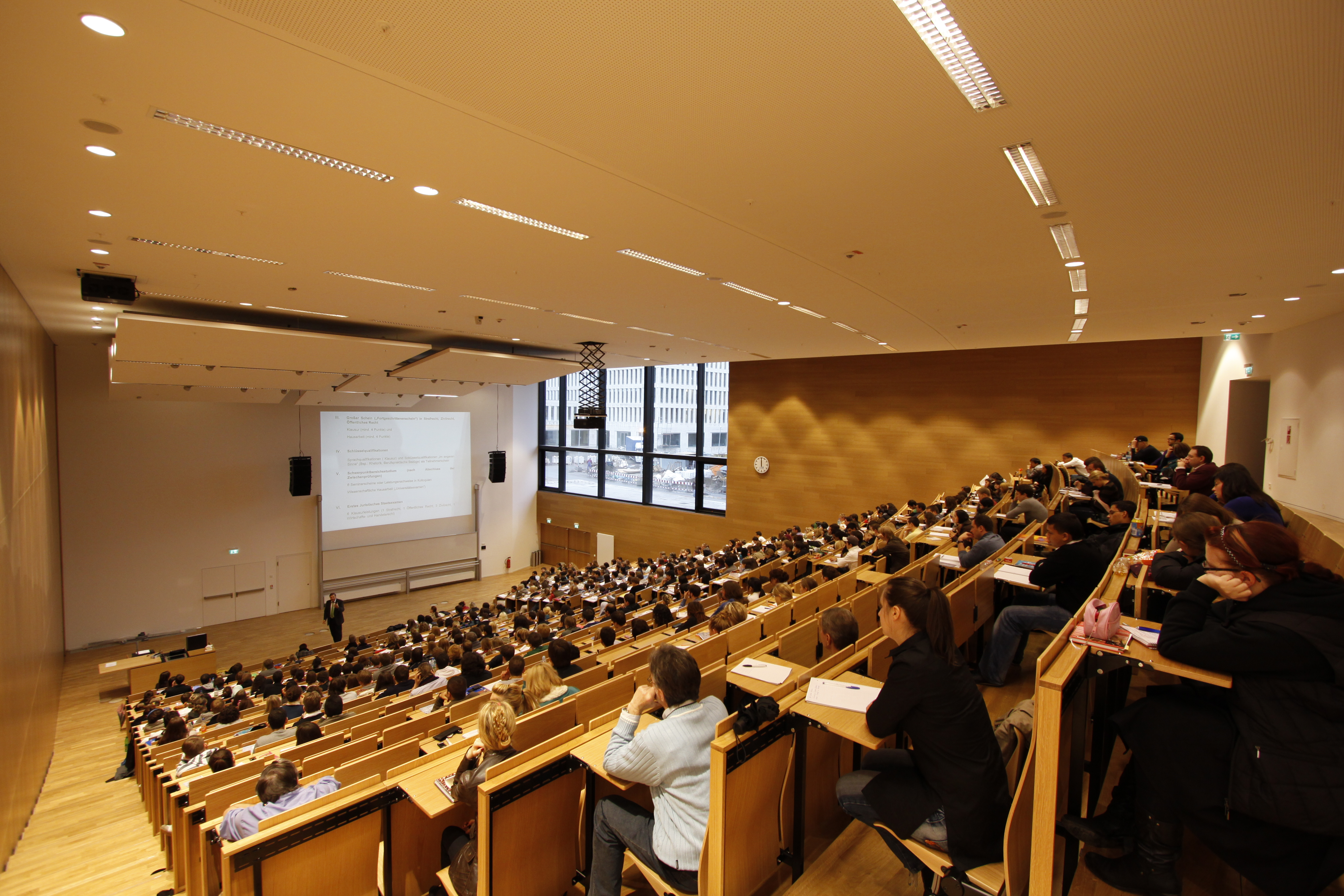
Campus Westend

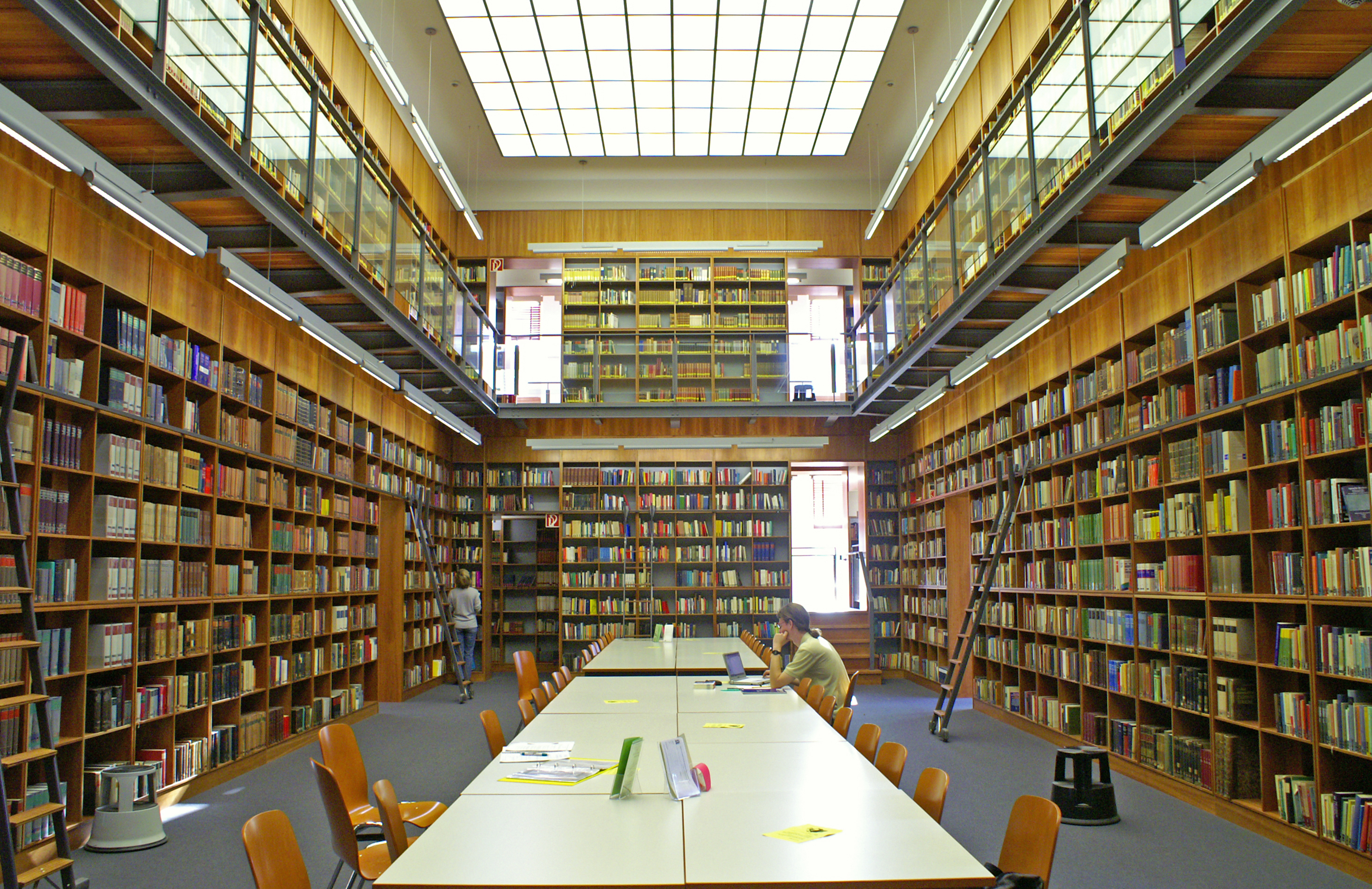
Humanities Library, IG Farben Building, Campus Westend

The university consists of 16 faculties. Ordered by their sorting number, these are:

- 01. Rechtswissenschaft (Law)
- 02. Wirtschaftswissenschaften (Economics and Business Administration)
- 03. Gesellschaftswissenschaften (Social Sciences)
- 04. Erziehungswissenschaften (Educational Sciences)
- 05. Psychologie und Sportwissenschaften (Psychology and Sports Sciences)
- 06. Evangelische Theologie (Protestant Theology)
- 07. Katholische Theologie (Catholic Theology)
- 08. Philosophie und Geschichtswissenschaften (Philosophy and History)
- 09. Sprach- und Kulturwissenschaften (Faculty of Linguistics, Cultures, and Arts)
- 10. Neuere Philologien (Modern Languages)
- 11. Geowissenschaften/Geographie (Geosciences and Geography)
- 12. Informatik und Mathematik (Computer Science and Mathematics)
- 13. Physik (Physics)
- 14. Biochemie, Chemie und Pharmazie (Biochemistry, Chemistry and Pharmacy)
- 15. Biowissenschaften (Biological Sciences)
- 16. Medizin (Medical Science)

In addition, there are several co-located research institutes of the Max Planck Society:

- Max Planck Institute of Biophysics
- Max Planck Institute for Brain Research
- Max Planck Institute for European Legal History

The university is involved in the Hessian Center for Artificial Intelligence (hessian.AI).

== Research ==
From 2027, the Goethe University Frankfurt as a part of the Rhine-Main Universities will be inducted into German Excellence Strategy of the Federal and State Governments, a competition for top-level universities research founding.

== Campuses ==
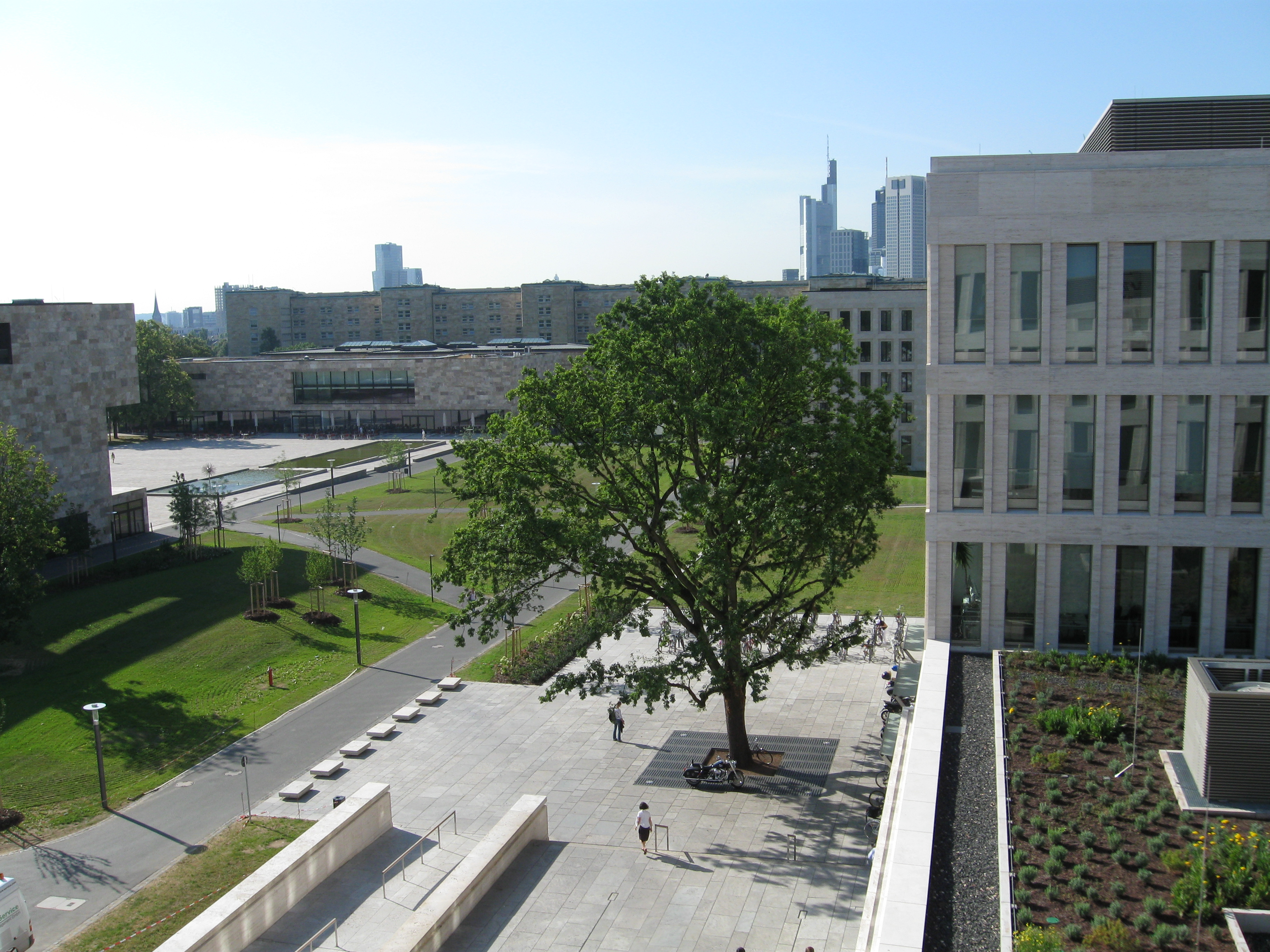
Campus Westend

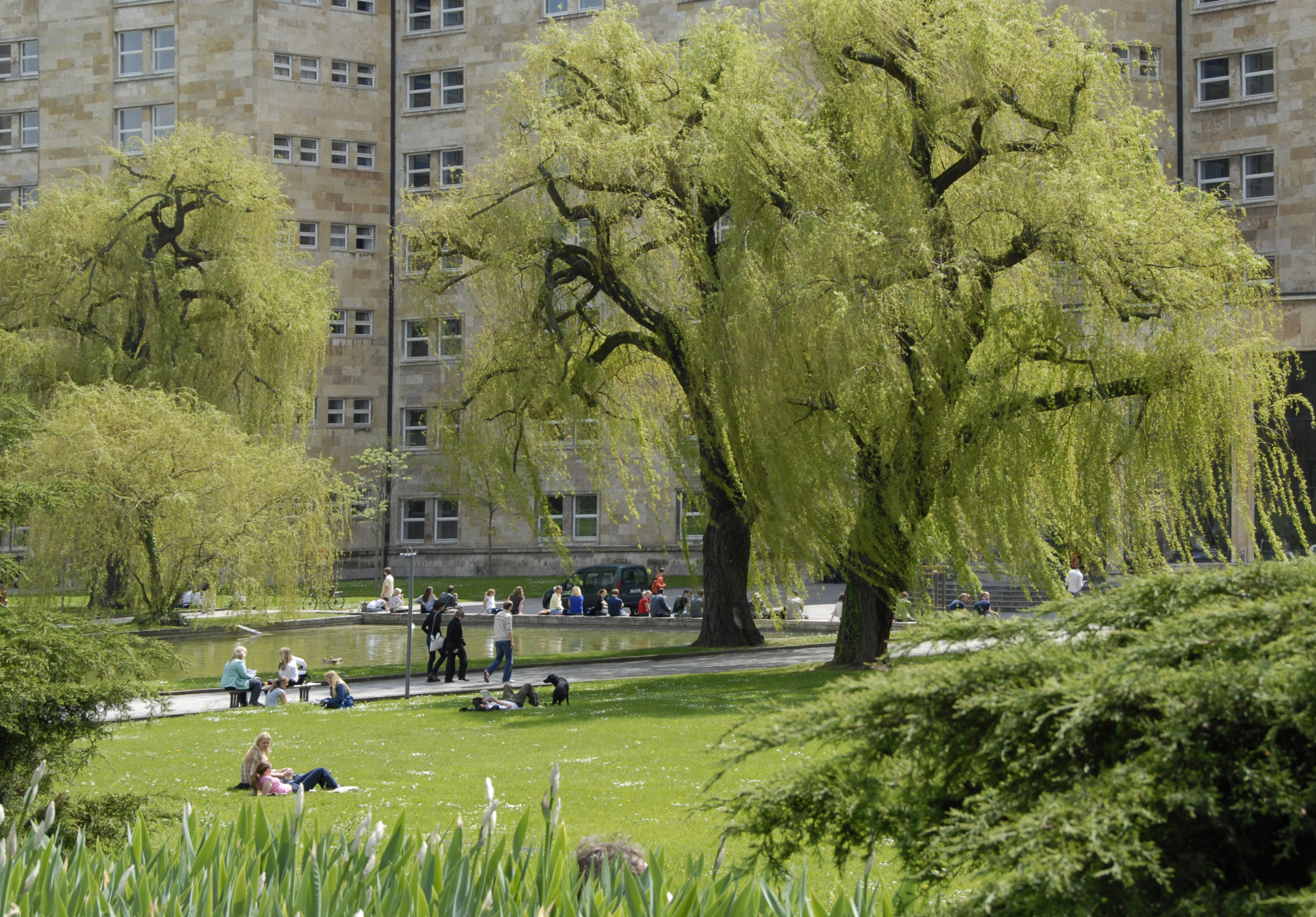
Campus Westend

The university is located across four campuses in Frankfurt am Main:

=== Campus Westend ===
The Westend Campus is the main location with the Presidential Board based in the Presidential and Administration Building (PA). The campus includes the I. G. Farben Building and numerous new buildings, including the House of Finance and the central lecture theatre building. In addition to the central administration, most departments, with the exception of Medicine and Natural Sciences, are or have been located here since 2001. The Language and Art Building (SKW) (FB 09) is currently the new building on campus. This campus is of particular historical significance, as Goethe University has inherited history through the acquisition of real estate.

"Campus Westend" of the university is dominated by the IG Farben Building by architect Hans Poelzig, an example of the modernist New Objectivity style. The style for the IG Farben Building was originally chosen as "a symbol for the scientific and mercantile German manpower, made out of iron and stone", as the IG Farben director at the time of construction, Baron von Schnitzler, stated in his opening speech in October 1930.

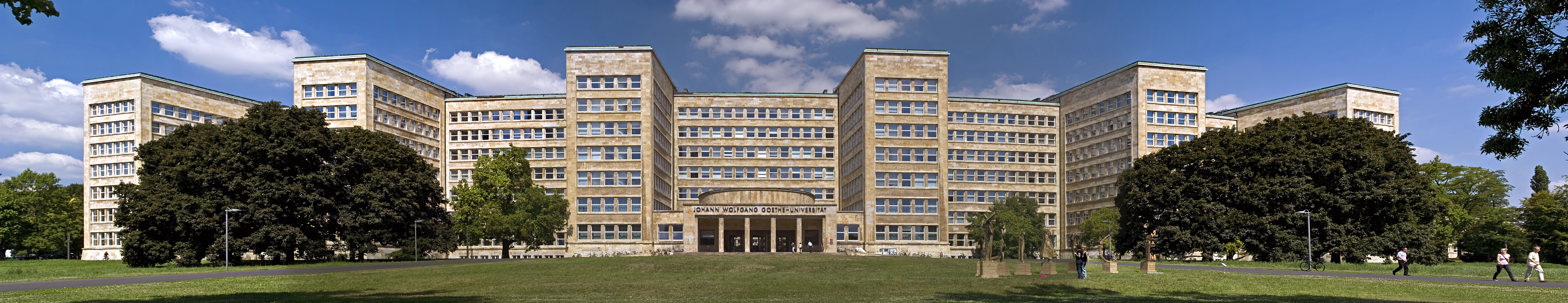
IG Farben Building at Uni Frankfurt

After the university took over the complex in the 1990s, new buildings were added to the campus. On 30 May 2008, the House of Finance relocated to a new building designed by the architects Kleihues+Kleihues, following the style of the IG Farben Building. The upper floors of the House of Finance building have several separate offices as well as shared office space for researchers and students. The ground floor is open to the public and welcomes visitors with a spacious, naturally lit foyer that leads to lecture halls, seminar rooms, and the information center, a 24-hour reference library. The ground floor also accommodates computer rooms and a café. The floors, walls and ceiling of the foyer are decorated with a grid design that is continued throughout the entire building. The flooring is inspired by Raphael's mural, The School of Athens.

The emergence of the Federal Republic of Germany and the Basic Law (Grundgesetz) can be traced back to the Frankfurter Dokumente that were handed over in the I. G. Farben Building.

=== Campus Bockenheim ===
The Bockenheim campus is the former centre of the university, which still houses various parts of the language and cultural sciences, the Department of Computer Science and Mathematics, the central building of the university library Johann Christian Senckenberg and some parts of the administration in buildings dating from the 1950s to the 1970s.

=== Campus Riedberg ===
The Riedberg campus, with university buildings built from around 1970, is home to the Departments of Physics, Biochemistry, Chemistry and Pharmacy, Biosciences and (largely) Earth Sciences, the Science Garden and a lecture theatre centre with the natural sciences departmental library.

=== Campus Niederrad ===
The Niederrad campus is home to the University Hospital and the Department of Medicine, with buildings and facilities that have grown historically since the 19th century as well as modern complexes.

=== Campus Ginnheim ===
Campus Ginnheim is the location of the athletics grounds, multiple tennis and volleyball courts, the sports halls, and the University Sports Centre. Ginnheim also houses many of the lecture halls for classes in physical education, sport psychology, and social sciences in sport.

=== General information ===
The university's relocation programme, which has been intensified since the mid-1990s, aims to create a de facto three-campus university in the future. To this end, the units currently located in the Bockenheim district are also to be relocated, but not the sports grounds.

The public Botanical Garden Frankfurt am Main at the end of Siesmayerstraße, formerly associated with the biology campus (1956–2011), has been transferred to the City of Frankfurt am Main and the responsibility of the Palmengarten. Parts of the former Bockenheim campus, including the historic Jügelhaus, have been taken over by the Senckenberg Gesellschaft für Naturforschung, while other parts have been left to local urban development. The formerly numerous other scattered university buildings in the Bockenheim district have been abandoned and partly demolished, partly put to other uses.

== Goethe Business School ==
The Goethe Business School is a graduate business school at the university, established in 2004, part of the House of Finance at the Westend Campus and the IKB building. It is a non-profit foundation under private law held by the university. Its board of directors is led by Rolf-Ernst Breuer, who was chairman of the board of Deutsche Bank until 2006. The school has maintained a partnership in Executive Education with the Indian School of Business (ISB) since 2009.

== Logo ==
The word/image mark used from 1980 to 2002 was developed by Adrian Frutiger. There are different types of basically the same logo.

- Johann Wolfgang Goethe Universität Frankfurt am Main
- Goethe Universität Frankfurt am Main
- Goethe Universität

As old university logos never really "expire", they remain valid. Since 2008, the university administration has made various changes to the practical name of the university and, accordingly, to the logo.

On 26 September 2016, another logo was also registered at the German Patent and Trade Mark Office as an individual trade mark, consisting only of the words "GOETHE UNIVERSITY". However, this logo is not currently in use.

== The Deutsche Bank Prize ==
The Deutsche Bank Prize in Financial Economics honors renowned researchers who have made influential contributions to the fields of finance and money and macroeconomics, and whose work has led to practical and policy-relevant results. It is awarded biannually, since 2005, by the Center for Financial Studies, in partnership with Goethe University Frankfurt. The award carries an endowment of €50,000, which is donated by the Stiftungsfonds Deutsche Bank im Stifterverband für die Deutsche Wissenschaft.

== Student organisations ==
=== Political university groups ===
According to information from the university, the political university groups are as follows:

- DGB Hochschulgruppe Frankfurt am Main
- DieLinke.SDS
- DL – Demokratische Linke Liste
- FDH – Fachschafteninitiative
- Demokratische Hochschule
- Grüne Hochschulgruppe
- JUSO Politische Hochschulgruppe Frankfurt
- Liberale Hochschulgruppe
- Linke Liste
- RCDS Frankfurt
- Rosa*Liste

There is little public information on the individual university groups and the work of the university committees, as there is usually only up-to-date information on university politics and/or university political actors on the respective websites of the General Students' Committee and the respective university parties, as well as representations in social networks. Further information and archives on university policy work at Goethe University do not exist, which is why there is hardly any transparency about university policy. There are official publications on the Goethe University website, which must be made in accordance with the Hessian Higher Education Act. These can also be found in the German National Library.

Little can be said about the political significance of university politics due to the lack of transparency in university politics as a whole and the lack of interest in its activities. Students are not very interested in university politics due to a voter turnout of less than 15% in recent years and the incidents and judgements against the AStA.

=== Student university groups and initiatives ===
The university management and the departments support numerous private and university-affiliated student groups, initiatives and private alumni organisations. There are also networks between the student university groups and initiatives via the departments and the Goethe University Network:

AIESEC; Amnesty International, Hochschulgruppe Frankfurt; Campusradio DauerWelle; Debattierclub Goethes Faust; Erasmus Student Network Frankfurt am Main (Hermes Club); Enactus Universität Frankfurt; European Law Students' Association Frankfurt am Main.; Frankfurter Studenten-Zeitung Diskus; Goethe's Green Office	Goethe Club; Goethe Gruppe; GREEN finance consulting; impress!; Literaturzeitschrift Johnny; MTP – Marketing zwischen Theorie und Praxis, Geschäftsstelle Frankfurt am Main; Nightline Frankfurt; ROCK YOUR LIFE! Frankfurt e. V.; StudentInnenfutter.; Studieren ohne Grenzen Frankfurt; TechAcademy

=== Student councils ===
The student councils at Goethe University are legally regulated by the Hessian Higher Education Act. They are therefore not student initiatives in the traditional sense, as they are legally binding institutions without their own legal personality.

=== Student initiatives from the Deutschlandstipendium ===
New student initiatives are regularly created at Goethe University as part of the Deutschlandstipendium programme. These initiatives are supported by the non-material support programme for the Deutschlandstipendium from the Presidential Board of Goethe University.

- Goethe Speaks Out
- Goethe Uni Tour/ExperienceCampus
- ExperienceFundraising
- uni:hautnah (mittlerweile integriert in die Studienberatung der Goethe Universität).
- Wissenschaftskommunikation

== Alumni organisations ==
=== University-related alumni organisations ===
Goethe University has its own non-exhaustive network of alumni organisations, a sponsors' association and its own e-mail distribution list for alumni. Alumni organisations require formal recognition and approval by the university administration in order to be listed as official alumni associations. Without such recognition, it is not possible for the association to list itself as an official alumni organisation of Goethe University. Officers of these organisations are mostly current and former professors as well as people in leading positions at Goethe University. The largest university-related alumni organisation with over 1,300 members is the Frankfurter Wirtschaftswissenschaftliche Gesellschaft (fwwg), which was founded in 1988 and is open to the Department of Economics. The Association of Friends and Supporters of the Johann Wolfgang Goethe University Frankfurt am Main (Vereinigung von Freunden und Förderern der Johann Wolfgang Goethe-Universität Frankfurt am Main) acts unofficially as an umbrella organisation for the university-related alumni organisations at Goethe University and is also the university's official support association.

=== Independent alumni organisations ===
Local, regional, national, European and international student initiatives have given rise to many parallel alumni networks that run in parallel and independently of each other. These include the alumni organisations of AIESEC, MTP – Marketing between Theory and Practice, European Law Students' Association, Erasmus Student Network and others. Student initiatives such as green finance consulting, Goethe Club, Goethe Gruppe or Night of Science, as well as political university groups, are further hybrids between student initiatives and alumni organisations. Independent alumni organisations are not recognised as official alumni organisations at Goethe University.

== Notable people ==
=== Alumni ===
- Theodor W. Adorno (1903–1969), double Ordinarius of philosophy and sociology and member of the Frankfurt School
- Max Horkheimer, member of the Frankfurt School
- Alex Karp, co-founder of Palantir Technologies and American billionaire
- Jürgen Habermas, sociologist and a philosopher
- Hans Bethe, theoretical physicist ( Nobel Prize 1967)
- Max Born, theoretical physicist and mathematician ( Nobel Prize 1954)
- Paul Ehrlich, Nobel Prize Winner 1908
- Walter Gerlach, theoretical physicist
- Walter Hallstein (1901–1982), first President of the European Commission
- Helmut Kiener, psychologist turned investment professional, founder of the ponzi scheme K1 fund
- Vladimir Košak, economist, lawyer, politician and diplomat
- Mahide Lein, LGBTQ+ activist
- Josef Mengele, officer and a physician in the Nazi concentration camp Auschwitz. Also known by the name "Angel of Death"
- Oskar Dirlewanger, officer, who served as the commander of the infamous Nazi SS penal unit "Dirlewanger Brigade" during World War II, a war criminal.
- Boudewijn Sirks, professor of the history of ancient law from 1997 to 2005, later Regius Professor of Civil Law at Oxford
- Walter Greiner, theoretical physicist in high energy physics
- Alfred Schmidt, philosopher and translator
- Horst Stöcker, theoretical physicist
- Alexander R. Todd, Baron Todd, chemist
- Luciano Rezzolla, theoretical astrophysicist
- Hannah Elfner, head of simulations at the Helmholtz Centre for Heavy Ion Research and professor of physics at the Goethe University Frankfurt
- Alexander T. Sack, neuroscientist and cognitive psychologist
- Helma Wennemers, German organic chemist and professor
- Nancy Faeser, German politician
- Nina Eisenhardt (born 1990), German politician
- Hans-Hermann Hoppe, German author and economist
- Jürgen Klopp, German Football executive and former manager

=== Nobel laureates ===
- Paul Ehrlich: 1908 Nobel Prize for Physiology or Medicine
- Max von Laue: 1914 Nobel Prize for Physics
- Otto Loewi: 1914 Nobel Prize for Physiology or Medicine
- Paul Karrer: 1937 Nobel Prize for Chemistry
- Otto Stern: 1943 Nobel Prize for Physics
- Max Born: 1954 Nobel Prize for Physics
- Alexander Robertus Todd: 1957 Nobel Prize for Chemistry
- Karl Ziegler: 1963 Nobel Prize for Chemistry
- Hans Bethe: 1967 Nobel Prize for Physics
- Niels Kaj Jerne: 1984 Nobel Prize for Physiology or Medicine
- Gerd Binnig: 1986 Nobel Prize for Physics
- Jean-Marie Lehn: 1987 Nobel Prize for Chemistry
- Hartmut Michel: 1988 Nobel Prize for Chemistry
- Reinhard Selten: 1994 Nobel Prize for Economics
- Christiane Nüsslein-Volhard: 1995 Nobel Prize for Physiology or Medicine
- Horst Ludwig Störmer: 1998 Nobel Prize for Physics
- Günter Blobel: 1999 Nobel Prize for Physiology or Medicine
- Peter Grünberg: 2007 Nobel Prize for Physics
- Benjamin List: 2021 Nobel Prize for Chemistry

== Rankings ==
University rankings

Overall – Global & National
QS World 2026	376	20
THE World 2026	201–250	20
ARWU World 2026	151–200	6–11

According to the QS World University Rankings for 2024, the university holds a global position of 302 and ranks 18th nationally. In the 2024 edition of the Times Higher Education World University Rankings, it is positioned between 201 and 250 internationally, and 22 to 24 within the country. The university achieved its highest national ranking in the 2023 Academic Ranking of World Universities (ARWU), where it was placed between 151 and 200 globally, and 6 to 9 nationally.

The New York Times: Among the World's 10 best universities by employer choice. Goethe University was ranked 10 out of 150 universities in 2012.

== Points of interest ==
- Botanischer Garten der Goethe-Universität Frankfurt am Main, a botanical garden
- IG Farben Building

== See also ==
- Center for Financial Studies
- Frankfurt University Library
- House of Finance
- Frankfurt Physical Society
- List of modern universities in Europe (1801–1945)
