= IDW =

IDW may refer to:

- IDW Publishing, a U.S. comic book publisher
- Informationsdienst Wissenschaft, a German science news service
- Institut der Wirtschaftsprüfer in Deutschland, a German non-profit organization serving public auditors
- Intellectual dark web, a loosely defined philosophical neologism coined by Eric Weinstein
- Inverse distance weighting, a mathematical method for surface fitting
- Investigative Data Warehouse, an FBI surveillance database
