= Engelhart CTP =

Commodities trading company

Engelhart Commodities Trading Partners (ECTP)
- Industry: Financial services
- Predecessor: BTG Commodities
- Founded: 2013 in Brazil
- Headquarters: London
- Area served: Worldwide
- Key people: Huw Jenkins (CEO)
- Website: www.ectp.com

Engelhart Commodities Trading Partners (ECTP) or Engelhart CTP is a commodities trading company founded in 2013 by BTG Pactual Group, headquartered in London. It has international coverage and is present in five countries. It was known as BTG commodities and started using the ECTP brand in 2016, after the split with the bank.

== History ==
In 2013, the BTG Pactual Group founded BTG Commodities, offering coverage, credit, and operations services, while limiting its physical commodity holdings. This move was contrary to the trend of major Wall Street banks withdrawing from the commodities market. BTG’s initiative aimed to increase market share left by the reduced presence of other banks and establish a global and diversified physical product trading platform. Thus, BTG Commodities was founded, which would later be renamed Engelhart. Trading began in the commodities market under the leadership of Ricardo Leiman, former president of Noble Group.

ECTP operates in financial trading, physical commerce, and credit provision. It does not directly own mines, power plants, farms, warehouses, or vessels. The company experienced rapid growth, generating almost $1bn of net income between 2013 and 2016, reaching a workforce of 825 employees across 18 different countries.

In June 2024, ECTP acquired Trailstone Group, shifting its focus from derivatives trading to physical natural gas and electricity trading in markets globally, including Japan and the US.
