= Federal Financial Supervisory Authority =

German financial regulator

- Bundesanstalt für Finanzdienstleistungsaufsicht

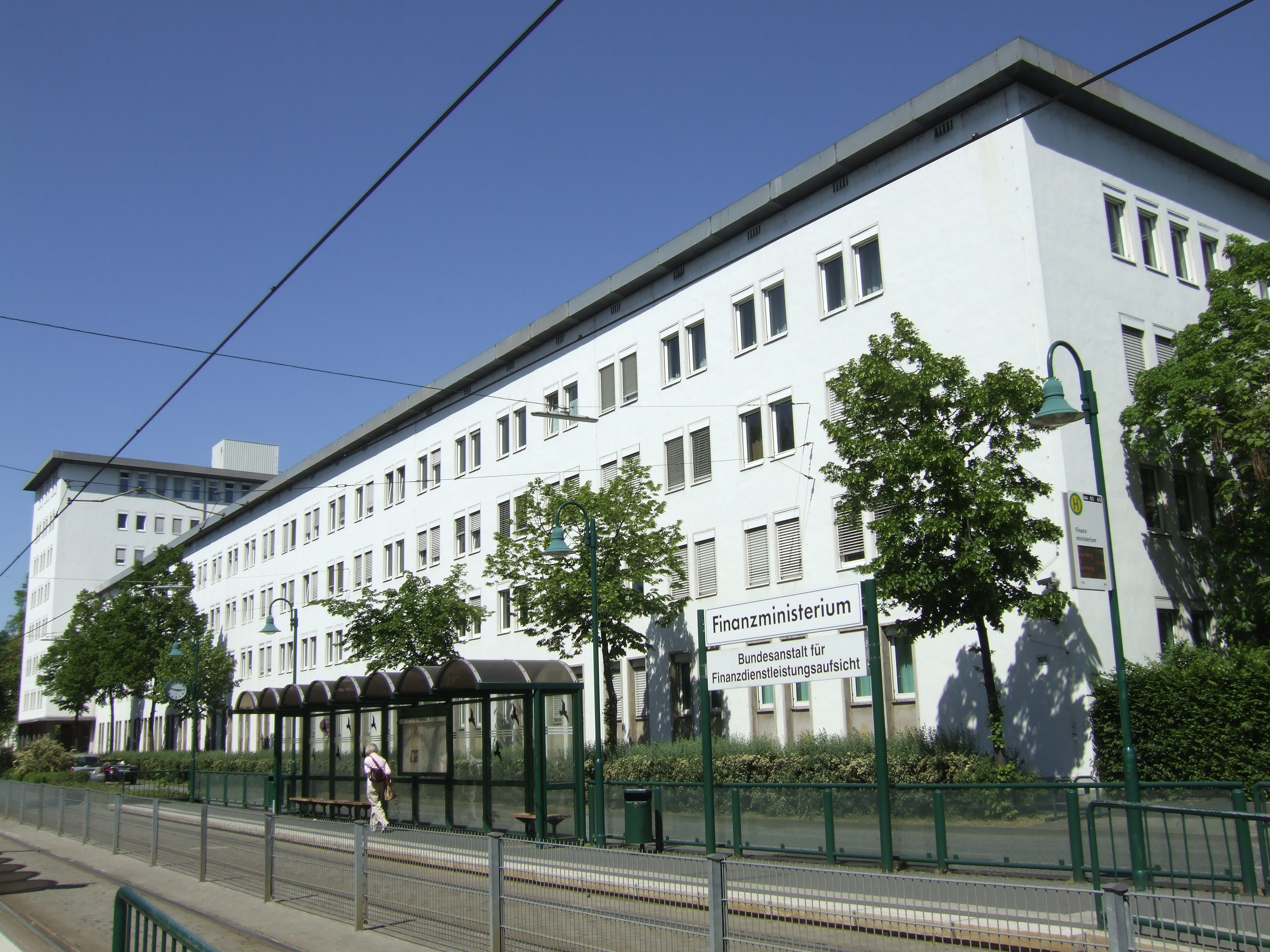
- BaFin Office in Bonn

Agency overview
- Formed: 1 May 2002
- Jurisdiction: Federal Republic of Germany
- Headquarters: Bonn and Frankfurt am Main, Germany
- Employees: 2,996 (31 December 2024)
- Agency executive: Mark Branson, President
- Website: www.bafin.de

The Federal Financial Supervisory Authority (BaFin; German: Bundesanstalt für Finanzdienstleistungsaufsicht) is Germany's integrated financial supervisory authority. It is an independent federal institution with headquarters in Bonn and Frankfurt and falls under the supervision of the Federal Ministry of Finance. BaFin supervises about 2,700 banks, 800 financial services institutions, and over 700 insurance undertakings.

Under European Union policy frameworks, BaFin is the national competent authority for Germany within European Banking Supervision. It is a voting member of the respective Boards of Supervisors of the European Banking Authority (EBA), European Insurance and Occupational Pensions Authority (EIOPA), and European Securities and Markets Authority (ESMA). It is Germany's designated National Resolution Authority and plenary session member of the Single Resolution Board (SRB). It provides the permanent single common representative for Germany in the Supervisory composition of the General Board of the Anti-Money Laundering Authority (AMLA). It is also a member of the European Systemic Risk Board (ESRB).

== History ==
=== 1930s beginnings ===
Prudential banking supervision in Germany essentially started as a consequence of the banking crisis of 1931, prior to which the only supervised credit institutions were the public savings banks. On 19 September 1931, a decree established the office of Reichskommissar für das Bankgewerbe (lit. 'Imperial Commissioner for Banking'), for which Chancellor Heinrich Brüning appointed Friedrich Ernst. In 1934, this was transformed into the Aufsichtsamt für das Kreditwesen, by new comprehensive banking legislation (German: Kreditwesengesetz of 5 December 1931). Initially the Reichsbank was associated with the supervisory process through a newly established Supervisory Office, but that role was transferred to the Economics Minister (German: Reichswirtschaftsminister) upon a legislative revision in 1939, and the Aufsichtsamt für das Kreditwesen itself was dissolved in 1944 with its duties taken over by the economics ministry.

=== Bundesaufsichtsamt für das Kreditwesen ===
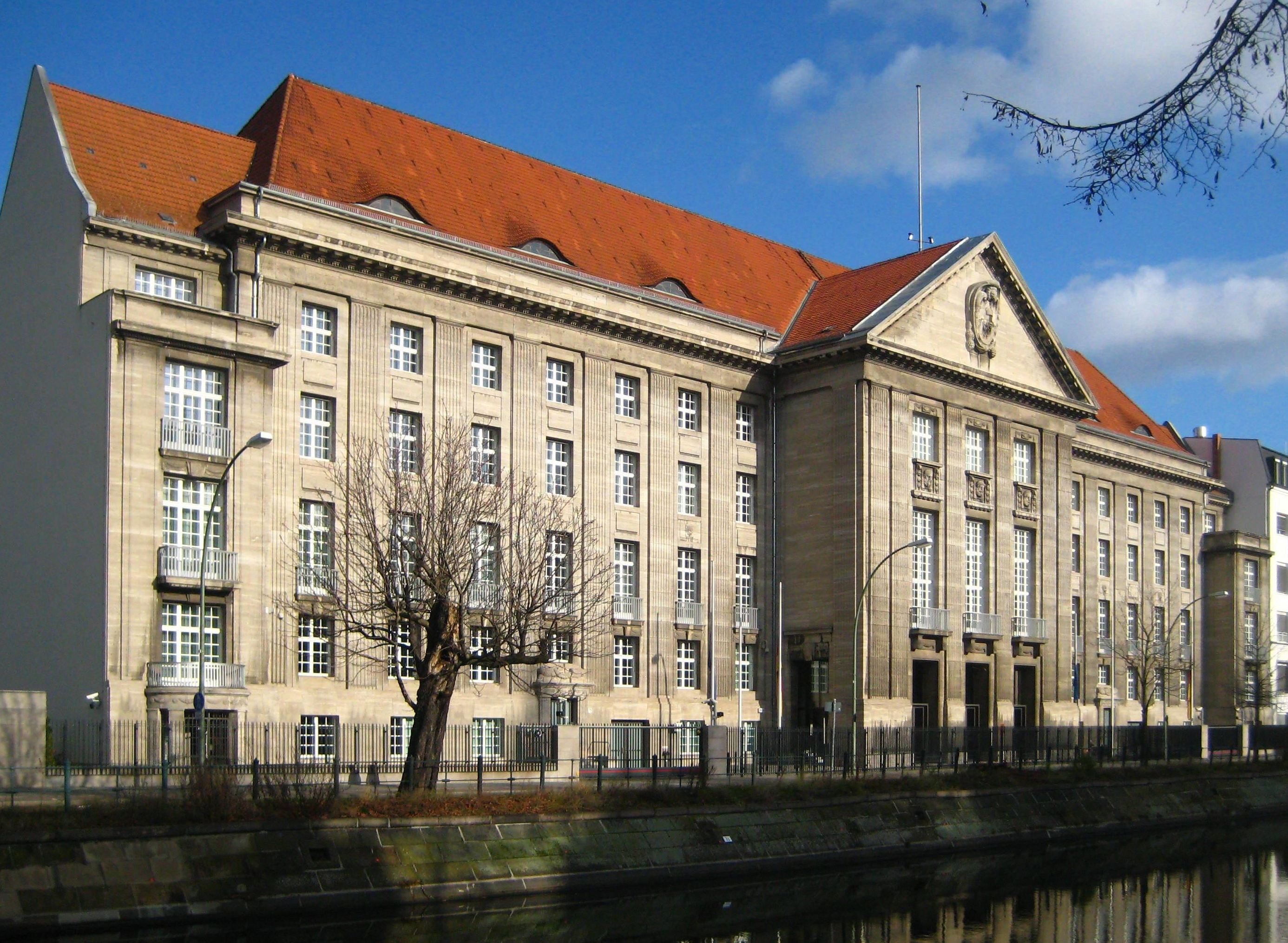
In the 1970s, the Bundesaufsichtsamt für das Kreditwesen was located at Reichpietschufer 72-76 in Berlin, later seat of the German Defence Ministry.

After World War II, banking supervision was devolved in West Germany to the Länder, until a national banking supervisor was re-established in 1962 as the Bundesaufsichtsamt für das Kreditwesen (known as BAK or BAKred), located in West Berlin, which again cooperated closely with the Deutsche Bundesbank. BAKred relocated from Berlin to Bonn in 1999.

=== Creation of BaFin and early development ===
BaFin was formed on 1 May 2002 by the merger of the Bundesaufsichtsamt für das Kreditwesen, the Federal Insurance Supervisory Office (German: Bundesaufsichtsamt für das Versicherungswesen or BAV, est. 1952 in West Berlin and relocated to Bonn in 2000), and the Federal Supervisory Office for Securities Trading (German: Bundesaufsichtsamt für den Wertpapierhandel or BAWe, est. 1995 in Frankfurt). This was achieved under the Financial Services and integration Act (German: Gesetz über die integrierte Finanzaufsicht, known as FinDAG) enacted on 22 April 2002. The aim was to create one integrated financial regulator that covered all financial markets. Thus, uniform national supervision of banks, credit institutions, insurance companies, financial service companies, brokers and stock exchanges would be achieved, providing transparency and manageability and to make sure all financial activity was regulated.

In 2003 changes to the Kreditwesengesetz (KWG) gave BaFin further responsibility to monitor the creditworthiness of financial institutions and to collect detailed information from those institutions. The aim was to increase customer protection and the reputation of the financial system. It shares responsibility here with the Bundesbank. As of 2015, BaFin is in transition, after major responsibilities for banking supervision shifted to the purview of the European Central Bank in November 2014.

=== 2008 financial crisis and aftermath ===
On 19 September 2008, in response to threats from the 2008 financial crisis and following measures taking by the United States, BaFin banned short selling on eleven German finance stocks. These were Aareal Bank, Allianz, AMB Generali, Commerzbank AG, Deutsche Bank, Deutsche Börse, Deutsche Postbank, Hannover Re, Hypo Real Estate, MLP AG and Munich Re. The ban expired on the 31 January 2010 and was not renewed at that time.

On 19 May 2010, in response to the euro area crisis, BaFin banned naked short selling of credit default swaps on euro-area government bonds until 31 March 2011. At the same time they re-introduced a ban on naked short selling of the previous 10 banks and insurers companies.

In 2019, BaFin banned short-selling in response to accusations of accounting fraud in Wirecard. Following the allegations, BaFin itself came under scrutiny the following year. In November 2020, the European Securities and Markets Authority (ESMA) published the results of its review which assessed the events leading to the collapse of Wirecard and the supervisory response by BaFin. This review identifies a number of deficiencies, inefficiencies and legal and procedural impediments relating to the following areas: the independence of BaFin from issuers and government; market monitoring by both BaFin and the Financial Reporting Enforcement Panel (FREP); examination procedures of FREP; and the effectiveness of the supervisory system in the area of financial reporting. In April 2021, German prosecutors in Frankfurt announced the opening of a criminal investigation into BaFin's supervision of Wirecard.

In December 2021, BaFin fined Deutsche Bank 8.66 million euros ($9.77 million) for controls related to the Euribor interest rate, the first fine imposed under a 2018 regulation that seeks to prevent manipulation of Euribor.

In May 2022, the Federal Ministry of Finance gave BaFin more leeway and independence in conducting its work. According to new cooperation principles between the two authorities, BaFin is to only inform the ministry in critical cases, for example when a large corporation is involved or if there is an impact on financial markets stability.

In August 2022, BaFin fined Bank of America 5.1 million euros ($5.28 million) for delays in reporting voting rights notifications.

== Operations ==
The main task of BaFin is the supervision of banks, insurance companies, and the trading of securities and ensure the viability, integrity, and stability of the German financial system. On the supply side, it pays attention to the solvency of banks, insurance companies, and financial institutions. For investors, bank customers, and the insured it ensures confidence in the financial markets and the companies operating therein.

BaFin is run by a Board consisting of the president and four executive directors for securities, banking supervision, insurance supervision and cross-functional areas and internal administration. In addition to these divisions, the so-called "operational pillars", there are a number of departments that have cross-organizational or perform administrative tasks, such as "risk modeling", "money laundering" and "international responsibilities".

BaFin employs roughly 3,000 at its two offices and is fully funded by fees and levies of the supervised institutions and companies and so is independent of the federal budget. The levy amounts depend on the scope and authorization of total assets. An appeal to the Constitutional Court regarding the unconstitutionality of this (forced) levy in 2009 was rejected as unfounded. In the opinion of the court, the levy is 'intended to strengthen investor confidence and the soundness and integrity of these companies. These are a necessary condition for a functioning financial framework'.

As of April 2026, BaFin's integrated supervisory role covers a broad range of financial entities. According to its official figures, this includes 1,089 "Less Significant Institutions" (LSIs) and 50 "Significant Institutions" (SIs) overseen within the framework of the Single Supervisory Mechanism (SSM) under the lead of the European Central Bank.

The authority also regulates 681 investment firms, 82 payment and e-money institutions, 339 leasing and factoring companies, and digital asset providers, including 8 crypto-security registrars and 8 crypto-asset service providers. Additionally, BaFin's oversight extends to 313 insurers, 34 pension funds, 122 provident funds (Pensionskassen), 695 asset management companies, and 8,882 domestic investment funds.

=== Accounts supervision ===
To maintain the integrity and stability of the financial system and combat money laundering BaFin is obliged, under the Banking Act, to run a centralized computer system that stores information on all accounts and their account holders. This information must be provided to BaFin by all financial institutions in Germany.

=== Banking ===
The Banking Act (KWG) is the legal basis for banking supervision by BaFin. It monitors compliance with the rules and guidelines of the Banking Act relating to credit and financial institutions.

The establishment of new banks in Germany is subject to a compulsory license subject to law, BaFin, as the competent authority, approves such licenses. It takes into account the management, minimum capital requirements, reliability, solid leadership, and the sustainability of the business when approving licenses.

In particular, the financial condition of solvency and liquidity, including having appropriate risk control - and management systems as described in the MaRisk-circulaire.

Financial institutions must provide BaFin with:

- the financial statements and audit reports
- the banks and financial service Kurzbilanzen
- monthly reports on wholesale and retail loans
- regularly demonstrations their compliance with the liquidity and solvency regulation

All information will be assessed and evaluated in close cooperation with the Deutsche Bundesbank. In addition, BaFin may order special tests, which are also carried out by members of the Bundesbank on the spot.

The Banking Law provides BaFin an extensive arsenal of sanctions including criminal sanctions, ranging from written warnings of fines to withdrawal of banking license.

=== Insurance ===
Similar to bank supervision, the Insurance Supervision Law (VAG) requires insurance companies to receive and maintain their business with the approval of BaFin, and the conditions are similar to those of banking supervision. BaFin supervises insurance companies (including pension and burial funds), holding companies, security, and pension funds. This excludes insurers that operate in only one province.

The supervisor shall include the monitoring of security assets and solvency to ensure that insurance contracts can be met.

=== Securities ===
BaFin is required to ensure the functioning of the German markets for securities and derivatives in accordance with the Securities Trading Act (WpHG). This includes in particular the prevention of insider trading and other market abuses such as price and market manipulation.

As part of this BaFin collects information on all securities traded as well as disclosures from listed companies from all market participants. This information is used to detect insider trading, price, and market manipulation. In particular, the buying and selling of shares by company management in the same company is monitored closely (Directors Dealings). BaFin also ensures market transparency by supervising reporting rules and disclosure requirements and makes sure these are followed.

BaFin enforcement powers range from the issuing of subpoenas and questioning people, suspending or prohibition trading in financial instruments up to being able to forward cases to the public prosecutor.

Since 2002, under the Securities Acquisition and Takeover Act (German: Wertpapiererwerbs- und Übernahmegesetz, WpÜG), it also deals with monopoly issues during mergers and acquisitions.

BaFin acts as the central depository for prospectus, however, BaFin only checks basic information and does not check for the accuracy and creditworthiness of the issuer.

=== The role of the BaFin in law enforcement ===
BaFin is in effect a law enforcement agency and can initiate legal action. It has the right, when it discovers a crime or even the suspicion of a crime, in particular insider trading, market manipulation, illegal operation of banking, financial fraud, or incitement to establish stock exchange speculation, to forward them to law enforcement authorities. BaFin also has the power to remove the top leaders of a bank, suspend shareholders' voting rights or appoint an outside supervisor to oversee management.

In the past, BaFin has hardly ever made use of its enforcement powers and typically resolved issues discreetly with any bank. Notably, the agency appointed special representatives with executive authority to help to run the European arm of VTB Bank (2022) and the German unit of Ziraat Bank (2022).

In 2016, BaFin opened a new office dedicated to corporate whistleblowers, aiming to encourage more business insiders to expose wrongdoing. The new office centralizes the collection of details from whistleblowers and follows a special protocol to ensure identities are kept secret. It can also be contacted anonymously under the procedure.

In March 2025, BaFin issued a supervisory notice addressing the risks of circumvention transactions in the context of anti-money laundering and counter-terrorism financing. These are transactions deliberately structured to bypass legal, regulatory, or contractual obligations - often by obscuring the true origin of funds or misrepresenting the parties involved. The document emphasized that financial institutions must apply enhanced due diligence measures when dealing with transactions that may obscure the economic background or geographical origin of funds. Notably, BaFin noted Iran-related transactions as a particular area of concern, given the potential for such dealings to bypass international sanctions regimes. This focus is informed in part by findings of the Financial Action Task Force (FATF), which has repeatedly cited Iran for systemic deficiencies in countering money laundering and the financing of terrorism. Iran is the only country specifically mentioned in the notice, and the central message is a call for heightened scrutiny and oversight of transactions potentially linked to Iranian trade.

== Governance ==
BaFin is a public law organisation staffed by German lifetime civil servants (Beamte) and regular employees. Its actions are governed by German administrative law and subject to judicial review by the Administrative Courts.

Its activities are funded by fees and levies paid by the regulated community. The fee and levy regime is governed by Part 5 of the BaFin Establishment Act (FinDAG).

Information received by BaFin in the exercise of its public functions is subject to statutory confidentiality regimes. See, for example, section 9(1) and (4) of the Banking Act (KWG) for a confidentiality regime and disclosure gateways (which is also applied with modifications by section 6 of the Payment Services Act (ZAG)).

== Leadership ==
=== Presidents of BAKred ===
- Heinz Kalkstein, 1962–1968
- Günter Dürre, 1968–1975
- Inge Lore Bähre, 1975–1984
- Wolfgang Kuntze, 1984–1994
- Wolfgang Artopoeus, 1994–2000
- Jochen Sanio, 2000–2002

=== Presidents of BaFin ===
- Jochen Sanio, 2002-2011
- Elke König, 2012-2014
- Felix Hufeld, 2015-2021
- Mark Branson, since August 2021

== Controversy ==
Soon after its establishment, there were signs that there were serious shortcomings within the internal structure of BaFin. An examination by the German Federal Court of Audit (Bundesrechnungshof) in Koblenz noted in March 2004 that the internal control system of authority is insufficient.

In 2006, the Federal Court revealed the embezzlement of more than 4 million euro by Michael Raumann, the former head of information technology at BaFin, for which he was indicted and convicted by the Bonn district court. In the sentencing notes the court criticized BaFin for its "nonexistent" internal controls.

In September 2006 a report by PricewaterhouseCoopers and BaFin internal audit found that the requirements of the federal government to prevent corruption had not been implemented.

=== BaFin list of default risk of German banks ===
In April 2009 an internal BaFin list containing the volume of loans and securities "from troubled business" and banks was leaked to the newspaper Sueddeutsche Zeitung. The internal paper estimated the volume of debt to be 816 billion euros. This confidential information was seen as potentially damaging to the creditworthiness of the banks and their sustainability and was seen as a serious breach by BaFin.

Shortly after the publication of the information, BaFin asked the Munich public prosecutor's to raise a criminal complaint against persons unknown on suspicion of breach of statutory duty of confidentiality.

BaFin created a working group together with the Federal Lawyer's Chamber, Assessor accountant, notaries, tax advisers and public accountants. The main objective of this group is to define "indications of possible money laundering activities" in connection with the work of the professions represented in this group. Furthermore, the Federal Chamber is in the process of establishing special Guidelines for its members, particularly in the interpretation of the Money Laundering Act.

=== Wirecard ===
Accusations of suspect accounting at Wirecard were levelled in 2008, 2015 and 2016 and 2019. Each time Wirecard alleged market manipulation, sparking investigations by BaFin which defended the company. Wirecard wound up in 2020 and its CEO was arrested, sparking criticism of BaFin itself. The Federal Ministry of Finance later disclosed that one fifth of BaFin staff had engaged in some kind of investment activity in 2019 and 2020, with an increasing interest in Wirecard in the months ahead of its collapse. Only in September 2020, BaFin banned its staff from trading shares and other securities of the companies that it oversees.

== See also ==
- Deutsche Bundesbank
- Federal agency (Germany)
- K1 fund, a German ponzi scheme that the BaFin tried to shut down
- Securities Commission
- List of financial supervisory authorities by country
