= Institut der Wirtschaftsprüfer in Deutschland =

Professional association for auditors and audit firms in Germany

Institute of Public Auditors in Germany e. V.
- Institut der Wirtschaftsprüfer in Deutschland e. V.
- Abbreviation: IDW
- Predecessor: Institut für das Revisions- und Treuhandwesen (IRT: 1930–1932)
- Founded: 1932 (renaming of IRT)
- Founder: Verband deutscher Bücherrevisionen (VDB), Fachgruppe der Treuhänder im Verband Deutscher Diplom-Kaufleute (VDDK), Verband Deutscher Treuhand- und Revisionsgesellschaften e.V., and Reichsbund Deutscher Treuhand-Aktiengesellschaften (established predecessor IRT in 1930)
- Type: Professional association (voluntary membership), Not-for-profit
- Purpose: Auditing, Accounting, Professional Regulation
- Headquarters: Roßstraße 74, 40476 Düsseldorf
- Location: Germany
- Coordinates: 51.2461°N 6.7785°E
- Products: IDW Verlautbarungen, Das WP Handbuch, WPg – Die Wirtschaftsprüfung (Journal), IDW Standards, MAIK (AI-powered digital tool)
- Members: 12,909 (2024)
- Key people: Ingmar Rega (President), Melanie Sack (Chair of the Executive Board), Torsten Moser, Daniel P. Siegel (Executive Board members), Dr. Britta van den Eynden (CEO, Verlag), Dr. Henrik Solmecke (CEO, Akademie)
- Affiliations: International Federation of Accountants (IFAC), Accountancy Europe, DRSC, BFB
- Staff: ~130 employees (IDW e.V.), including 34 WP, StB, or Attorney qualifications
- Website: www.idw.de
- Remarks: Subsidiaries: IDW Verlag GmbH and IDW Akademie GmbH. Organised into 12 regional state groups (Landesgruppen) supported by 7 regional offices. Combined Total Assets (2023) for subsidiaries: IDW Verlag (€8.17M) + IDW Akademie (€3.77M) = €11.94M.

Institute der Wirtschaftsprüfer in Deutschland e.V. (Institute of Public Auditors in Germany, Incorporated Association - IDW) is a privately run organization based in Düsseldorf established to serve its members who comprise both individual Wirtschaftsprüfers (German Public Auditors) and Wirtschaftsprüfungsgesellschaften (German Public Audit firms) (Bylaws §1, §3). The IDW was established on a voluntary basis rather than having been established under German law. In accordance with its Articles of Incorporation, the IDW does not operate as a commercial business and is a not-for-profit organization (Bylaws §2 Sec. 5). Membership as of 31 December 2024 was 12,909 full members, of whom 11,782 were German public auditors (91% of all German public auditors) and 1,127 were German public audit firms (Bylaws §4 Sec. 4).

== History ==
=== Genesis and Early Institutionalization (1884–1929) ===
1884 saw the introduction of the foundation audit (Gründungsprüfung) for stock corporations (Aktiengesellschaften). As a result, courts began appointing so-called Sworn Book Auditors (Beeidete Bücherrevisoren) as sworn experts in accounting matters. The North German Hanseatic cities created legal frameworks for the activities of this profession. Later, the opportunity to appoint Book Auditors was established at the national level through Section 36 of the Trade Regulation Act (Gewerbeordnung). In 1890, the Deutsche Treuhandgesellschaft (German Trust Company) was established. The Association of German Book Auditors (VDB), which emerged from a merger of Berlin-based auditors, was constituted in 1900. English and American firms, such as Price Waterhouse and Whinney's, established branch offices in Berlin.

=== Crisis, Legislative Birth, and IDW Foundation (1929–1936) ===
By 1929, the VDB counted 853 Book Auditors as its members. In the summer of 1929, the Frankfurter Allgemeine Versicherungs AG (FAVAG), the second-largest insurance company in the German Reich, collapsed. Against the backdrop of the FAVAG collapse and to accelerate parts of the reform, the "Ordinance of the Reich President on Stock Corporation Law, Bank Supervision, and Tax Amnesty (VO) was published on September 19, 1931. Among other things, it contained regulations on the duty of disclosure (annual report, annual financial statements, and audit). Balance sheet auditors were only permitted to be individuals experienced and educated in bookkeeping. Auditing firms were only permitted to audit balance sheets if one of their owners, board members, or managing directors was experienced and educated in bookkeeping.

The Institut für das Revisions- und Treuhandwesen e.V. (IRT) was founded in August 1930 based in Berlin by several professional associations from the German auditing and fiduciary sector (Verband deutscher Bücherrevisionen (VDB), Fachgruppe der Treuhänder im Verband Deutscher Diplom-Kaufleute (VDDK), Verband Deutscher Treuhand- und Revisionsgesellschaften e.V., and Reichsbund Deutscher Treuhand-Aktiengesellschaften). In 1930 the Main Office for publicly appointed auditors (Wirtschaftsprüfer) was established.The IRT's goal was to participate in the legislation for the auditing profession. Simultaneously, the IRT attempted to bridge the differing interests between individual auditors and the larger fiduciary companies. The states of the German Reich established the legal and institutional framework for the new profession. In 1931, twelve admission and examination bodies for Public Auditors were created. The profession of the Wirtschaftsprüfer (Public Auditor) was created by the 1st Implementing Ordinance to the VO on December 15, 1931. Public Auditors had to be publicly appointed, and auditing firms had to be registered.

On February 1, 1932, the Institut der Wirtschaftsprüfer e.V. (IDW) [Institute of Public Auditors, Incorporated Association] was established in Berlin through a renaming of the IRT. Only Public Auditors (Wirtschaftsprüfer) and Public Audit firms (Wirtschaftsprüfungsgesellschaften) could become members of the IDW. One of the goals of the IDW was to develop into a professional representative body that could uniformly advocate for its interests externally. The IDW published its first professional opinion in 1933; the topic was 'The Level of Detail in the Audit Report,' followed by 17 further professional opinions later that same year. The journal's inaugural issue in January 1932 cemented the name 'Der Wirtschaftsprüfer' as the essential professional reading for all publicly appointed auditors. The first managing directors were Dr. Hans Adler and Dr. Paul-Ludwig Buchholz. It was a private association without a public-law character, with the intention of developing into a professional representative body. A professional liability insurance policy for the members was concluded with Lloyd's. The “Confidential News” (Vertraulichen Nachrichten) was published as the members' magazine. The first technical committee—shortly thereafter renamed the Main Technical Committee (HFA)—was constituted with the task of clarifying important issues concerning mandatory audits. The first annual meeting took place on February 19, 1933. In May 1933, the Third Reich recognized the IDW as the official professional representative body for Public Auditors. In June 1934, membership in the IDW became mandatory for Public Auditors. The mandatory audit requirement for all stock corporations (Aktiengesellschaften) is introduced in 1934. In 1935 a loose-leaf collection of professional opinions (Fachgutachten) is published for the first time. The statutory annual audit is suspended by regulations dated September 4th 1934. In 1936 the auditing of cooperatives by certified public auditors is regulated.

=== Dissolution, Post-War Re-establishment, and WPO (1939–1966) ===
After its integration and dissolution into the Reich Chamber of Economic Trustees in April 1943, the Chamber itself was dissolved in October 1945 following the end of World War II. In 1946, individual institutes reformed in Germany, and the associations in the British Occupation Zone merged in the same year to form the Institut der Wirtschaftsprüfer e.V. with 440 voluntary members starting in Nord-Rheinprovinz/Westfalen and began publishing the "Fachnachrichten" newsletter. Further state representations were founded in the following years. The association moved to Düsseldorf in 1948. On September 18, 1950, its own publishing house, Verlagsbuchhandlung des Instituts der Wirtschaftsprüfer [Publishing House of the Institute of Public Auditors], was founded as a GmbH (limited liability company). In 1954, the IDW was a founding member of the Union Europénne des Experts Comptables Economiques et Financiers [European Union of Economic and Financial Accountants]. In the same year, the association's name was changed to Institut der Wirtschaftsprüfer in Deutschland e.V. [Institute of Public Auditors in Germany, Incorporated Association]. The year 1961 saw the enactment of the federal Auditors' Act (WPO), which established the Chamber of Public Auditors (WPK) to take over the professional regulatory functions for the auditing profession. The IDW offered preparatory courses for the Public Auditor examination for the first time in 1966.

=== Global Integration and Quality Standards (1972–1995) ===
The publishing house has operated as IDW-Verlag GmbH since 1972. When the IASC (International Accounting Standards Committee) was founded in 1973 and the International Federation of Accountants (IFAC) was founded in 1977 at The 11th International Congress of Accountants in Munich, the IDW was again involved as a founding member in each instance. In 1995, the IDW and the WPK reinforced auditing standards by issuing a joint statement (VO 1/1995) focused on Quality Assurance in Auditing Practice.

=== Capital Markets and Regulatory Tightening (1998–2005) ===
The 1998 KonTraG Act increased auditor liability limits and mandated internal rotation for auditors of listed companies, while also establishing the DRSC. The 1998 Capital Market Access Facilitation Act (KapAEG) allowed listed companies to prepare consolidated financial statements using IAS or US-GAAP, providing an exemption from German HGB rules. In 2000, the KapCoRiLiG Act was published, subjecting limited-liability commercial partnerships to the same accounting and auditing requirements as corporations. The 2002 Transparency and Disclosure Act (TransPuG) was enacted, primarily resulting in changes to the content of the audit report. On July 30, 2002, the Sarbanes-Oxley Act (SOX) came into effect in the US, significantly impacting the German auditing market. The 2005 Auditor Oversight Act (APAG) established an independent commission to supervise auditors and sworn book auditors conducting statutory audits.

=== Modernization and EU/International Adaptation (2009–2018) ===
2009: With the entry into force of the Accounting Law Modernization Act (BilMoG) on May 29, 2009, German accounting law underwent fundamental changes in the sense of modernization and adaptation to international accounting principles. On May 27, 2014, the EU Regulation and amended Audit Directive governing the audit of public-interest entities (PIEs) were published, marking a major European audit reform. In November 2018, the IDW published the first major package of 12 draft Germanized International_Standards_on_Auditing (ISA [DE]), with further drafts following in 2019.

== Governance ==
The IDW was established in 1932 and operates with approximately 130 employees (34 of whom hold German Public Auditor, Tax Advisor, or Attorney qualifications). The organizational structure includes twelve regional state groups (Landesgruppen) supported by seven regional offices to represent members' local interests. Governance is handled by three main organs: the Wirtschaftsprüfertag (General Assembly of Members), the Verwaltungsrat (Administrative Board), and the Vorstand (Executive Board), the latter composed of six honorary and three managing members. The bylaws detail the membership and define concrete professional duties for actively practicing members. These duties include adhering to the IDW's principles for quality assurance, providing a written justification for any deviation from IDW publications (Auditing Standards, Accounting Opinions) in the audit report, and completing an average of 40 hours of continuing professional development per year.

== Mission ==
In accordance with its by-laws, the organization fosters the technical domain of the public auditor and represents the interests of the profession (Bylaws §2 Sec. 1). The IDW does this both nationally and internationally through collaboration within the various committees, and with permanent and ad-hoc IDW working parties in cooperation with technical staff at the headquarters in Düsseldorf (Bylaws §2 Sec. 4).

The organization:

- Represents the professional interests of its members at national and international levels (Bylaws §2 Sec. 1);
- Undertakes technical work relevant to the fields in which its members are active (Bylaws §2 Sec. 2);
- Provides training courses and support for trainee public auditors and continuing professional development for qualified public auditors (Bylaws §2 Sec. 2a);
- Provides support to members on technical issues in their day-to-day work (Bylaws §4 Sec. 2).

== Technical work ==
The IDW's technical work is mainly apparent in:

- statements in the form of expert opinions, IDW auditing standards and IDW opinions on accounting, IDW standards, information and working aids (Bylaws §12);
- comments on draft statutes, regulations, position papers and technical standards at both national and international levels;
- expert opinions provided in response to members' questions involving accounting and auditing and advice on taxation and management (Bylaws §4 Sec. 2).

The IDW also provides:

- membership of committees in various organizations, among them the Fédération des Experts Compatibles Europeans (FEE) and the International Federation of Accountants (IFAC);
- political contacts on issues affecting the profession through IDW offices in Berlin and Brussels (Bylaws §14)
- representation of the profession to the press and the public.

== IDW Pronouncements ==
This list provides a categorized and chronological overview of selected pronouncements from the Institute of Public Auditors in Germany (IDW), including Auditing Standards (PS), and adopted International Standards on Auditing (ISA [DE]).

=== Key to Publications ===
Abbreviation	Full Name (German)	English Translation	Period
WPg	Zeitschrift „Die Wirtschaftsprüfung“	The Auditing Journal	Continual Publication
FN	„Fachnachrichten“ des Instituts der Wirtschaftsprüfer	Professional News of the IDW	Until 10/2015
IDW Life	„IDW Life und IDW Fachnachrichten“	IDW Life and Professional News	From 11/2015

Note on ISA [DE]: International Standards on Auditing (ISA-DE) are published in German translation, with necessary deviations due to specific legal regulations in Germany, marked by "D-Textziffern" (D-text paragraphs).

== I. Audits of Historical Financial Information (International Standards on Auditing) ==
=== 200–299 General Principles and Responsibilities ===
ISA: General Principles and Responsibilities
Standard	Title (English)
ISA 200	Overall Objectives of the Independent Auditor and the Conduct of an Audit in Accordance with International Standards on Auditing
ISA 210	Agreeing the Terms of Audit Engagements
ISA 220 (Revised)	Quality Management for An Audit of Financial Statements
ISA 230	Audit Documentation
ISA 240	The Auditor's Responsibilities Relating to Fraud in an Audit of Financial Statements
ISA 250 (Revised)	Consideration of Laws and Regulations in an Audit of Financial Statements
ISA 260 (Revised)	Communication with Those Charged with Governance
ISA 265	Communicating Deficiencies in Internal Control to Those Charged with Governance and Management

---

=== 300–499 Risk Assessment and Response to Assessed Risks ===
ISA: Risk Assessment and Response
Standard	Title (English)
ISA 300	Planning an Audit of Financial Statements
ISA 315 (Revised 2019)	Identifying and Assessing the Risks of Material Misstatement
ISA 320	Materiality in Planning and Performing an Audit
ISA 330	The Auditor's Responses to Assessed Risks
ISA 402	Audit Considerations Relating to an Entity Using a Service Organization
ISA 450	Evaluation of Misstatements Identified during the Audit

---

=== 500–599 Audit Evidence ===
ISA: Audit Evidence
Standard	Title (English)
ISA 500	Audit Evidence
ISA 501	Audit Evidence—Specific Considerations for Selected Items
ISA 505	External Confirmations
ISA 510	Initial Audit Engagements—Opening Balances
ISA 520	Analytical Procedures
ISA 530	Audit Sampling
ISA 540 (Revised)	Auditing Accounting Estimates and Related Disclosures
ISA 550	Related Parties
ISA 560	Subsequent Events
ISA 570 (Revised)	Going Concern
ISA 580	Written Representations

---

=== 600–699 Using the Work of Others ===
ISA: Using the Work of Others
Standard	Title (English)
ISA 600 (Revised)	Special Considerations—Audits of Group Financial Statements (Including the Work of Component Auditors)
ISA 610 (Revised 2013)	Using the Work of Internal Auditors
ISA 620	Using the Work of an Auditor's Expert

---

=== 700–799 Audit Conclusions and Reporting ===
ISA: Audit Conclusions and Reporting
Standard	Title (English)
ISA 700 (Revised)	Forming an Opinion and Reporting on Financial Statements
ISA 701	Communicating Key Audit Matters in the Independent Auditor's Report
ISA 705 (Revised)	Modifications to the Opinion in the Independent Auditor's Report
ISA 706 (Revised)	Emphasis of Matter Paragraphs and Other Matter Paragraphs in the Independent Auditor's Report
ISA 710	Comparative Information—Corresponding Figures and Comparative Financial Statements
ISA 720 (Revised)	The Auditor's Responsibilities Relating to Other Information

---

=== 800–899 Specialized Areas ===
ISA: Specialized Areas
Standard	Title (English)
ISA 800 (Revised)	Special Considerations—Audits of Financial Statements Prepared in Accordance with Special Purpose Frameworks
ISA 805 (Revised)	Special Considerations—Audits of Single Financial Statements and Specific Elements, Accounts or Items of a Financial Statement
ISA 810 (Revised)	Engagements to Report on Summary Financial Statements

---

=== International Auditing Practice Notes (IAPN) ===
International Auditing Practice Notes
Standard	Title (English)
IAPN 1000	Special Considerations in Auditing Financial Instruments

== II. IDW Auditing Standards (IDW PS) and Drafts (IDW EPS) ==
This section lists various IDW PS, categorized by their main content focus, with the latest status date and application note where available.

=== A. General Principles, Risk Assessment, and Planning (PS 100–300) ===
IDW PS: Principles, Risk, and Planning
IDW PS	Title (English Translation - Abbreviated)	Status/Date	Application/Note
PS 140 n.F.	Quality Control in Audit Practices (New Version)	09.06.2017	Supersedes PS 140 (22.08.2008).
PS 200	Objectives and General Principles of Audits	03.06.2015	Standard current version date.
PS 201 n.F.	Accounting and Auditing Principles (New Version)	23.04.2021	Supersedes PS 201 (05.03.2015).
PS 202	Assessment of Additional Information Published with Financial Statements	09.09.2010	Standard current version date.
PS 203 n.F.	Events After the Reporting Date (New Version)	09.09.2009	For reporting periods beginning on or after **15.12.2009**.
PS 205	Audit of Opening Balances in First Audits	09.09.2010	Standard current version date.
PS 208	Principles for Performing Joint Audits (Joint Audit)	24.11.2010	Standard current version date.
PS 210	Detection of Irregularities (Fraud)	12.12.2012	Standard current version date.
PS 220	Engagement of the Auditor	09.09.2009	Standard current version date.
PS 230	Knowledge of Business Activities and Economic/Legal Environment	08.12.2005	Standard current version date.
PS 240	Principles of Audit Planning	09.09.2010	Standard current version date.
PS 250 n.F.	Materiality in the Audit (New Version)	12.12.2012	For reporting periods beginning on or after **15.12.2012**.
PS 255	Related Parties in the Audit	24.11.2010	Standard current version date.
PS 260	Internal Control System in the Audit	02.07.2001	Replaced by IDW PS 261.
PS 261 n.F.	Identifying and Assessing Risks and Auditor Responses	15.09.2017	For reporting periods beginning on or after **15.12.2011**.
PS 270 n.F.	Assessment of Going Concern (New Version)	11.07.2018	Supersedes PS 270 (09.09.2010).

=== B. Audit Evidence and Execution (PS 300–399) ===
IDW PS: Audit Evidence and Execution
IDW PS/EPS	Title (English Translation - Abbreviated)	Status/Date	Application/Note
PS 300 n.F.	Audit Evidence (New Version)	15.12.2016	For reporting periods beginning on or after **15.12.2016**.
PS 301	Audit of Inventory Counting	24.11.2010	Standard current version date.
PS 302 n.F.	Third-Party Confirmations (New Version)	10.07.2014	For reporting periods beginning on or after **15.12.2013**.
PS 303 n.F.	Management Representations (New Version)	09.09.2009	For reporting periods beginning on or after **15.12.2009**.
PS 310	Sampling Procedures in Auditing	14.06.2016	Standard current version date.
PS 312	Analytical Procedures	13.03.2013	Standard current version date.
PS 314 n.F.	Auditing Estimates and Fair Values (New Version)	09.09.2009	For reporting periods beginning on or after **15.12.2009**.
PS 315	Audit of Fair Values	08.12.2005	Replaced by IDW PS 314 n.F.
PS 318	Audit of Comparative Information on Prior Years	24.11.2010	Standard current version date.
PS 320 n.F.	Group Audits and Component Auditors (New Version)	10.07.2014	For reporting periods beginning on or after **15.12.2011**.
PS 321	Internal Audit and External Audit	09.09.2010	Standard current version date.
PS 322 n.F.	Using the Work of an Auditor's Expert (New Version)	15.09.2017	For reporting periods beginning on or after **15.12.2013**.
PS 330	Audit in an IT Environment	24.09.2002	Standard current version date.
PS 331 n.F.	Audit of Outsourced Accounting (Service Organizations) (New Version)	11.09.2015	For reporting periods beginning on or after **31.12.2015**.
PS 340	Audit of the Risk Early Warning System (§ 317 Abs. 4 HGB)	11.09.2000	Standard current version date.
EPS 340 n.F.	Audit of Measures under § 91 Abs. 2 AktG (Draft)	27.05.2020	Draft version.
PS 345	Impact of the German Corporate Governance Code on the Audit	10.07.2017	Standard current version date.
EPS 345 n.F.	Impact of the German Corporate Governance Code on the Audit (Draft)	22.09.2020	Draft version.
PS 350 n.F.	Audit of the Management Report (*Lagebericht*) (New Version)	12.12.2017	Standard current version date.
**PS 351**	**Formal Audit of Information on the Gender Quota**	**11.2023**	Standard current version date.
**EPS 352**	**Substantive Audit of the Non-Financial (Group) Statement (Draft)**	**08.2022**	Draft version.
PS 380	Audit of IT Adjustment to the Millennium Change	26.06.1998	Annulled (aufgehoben).

=== C. Reporting and Communication (PS 400–499) ===
IDW PS: Reporting and Communication
IDW PS/EPS	Title (English Translation - Abbreviated)	Status/Date	Application/Note
PS 400 n.F.	Forming an Audit Opinion and Issuing the Audit Report (New Version)	30.11.2017	Standard current version date.
EPS 400 n.F.	Forming an Audit Opinion and Issuing the Audit Report (Draft)	29.04.2021	Draft version.
PS 401 n.F.	Communication of Key Audit Matters (KAM) in the Audit Report (New Version)	29.04.2021	Supersedes 30.11.2017 version.
PS 405	Modifications to the Audit Opinion in the Audit Report	30.11.2017	Standard current version date.
EPS 405 n.F.	Modifications to the Audit Opinion in the Audit Report (Draft)	29.04.2021	Draft version.
PS 406	Emphasis of Matter and Other Matter Paragraphs	30.11.2017	Standard current version date.
EPS 406 n.F.	Emphasis of Matter and Other Matter Paragraphs (Draft)	29.04.2021	Draft version.
EPS 410	Audit of Electronic Reproductions for Disclosure (§ 317 Abs. 3b HGB)	09.10.2020	Draft version.
PS 450 n.F.	Principles for the Proper Preparation of Audit Reports (New Version)	15.09.2017	Standard current version date.
PS 460 n.F.	Auditor's Working Papers (New Version)	09.09.2009	For reporting periods beginning on or after **15.12.2008**.
PS 470 n.F.	Communication with Those Charged with Governance (New Version)	10.01.2017	Supersedes PS 470 (01.03.2012).
EPS 470 n.F.	Communication with Those Charged with Governance (Draft)	29.04.2021	Draft version.
PS 475	Communication of Deficiencies in Internal Control to Governance/Management	26.03.2020	Standard current version date.
PS 480	Audit of Special Purpose Financial Statements	28.11.2014	Standard current version date.
PS 490	Audit of Financial Statements or Components Thereof	28.11.2014	Standard current version date.

=== D. Sector-Specific and Special Audits (PS 500–899) ===
IDW PS: Sector-Specific and Special Engagements
IDW PS/EPS	Title (English Translation - Abbreviated)	Status/Date	Application/Note
PS 520	Peculiarities in the Audit of Financial Services Institutions	02.07.2001	Replaced by IDW PH 9.520.1.
PS 521 n.F.	Audit of Securities Services Business (§ 89 WpHG) (New Version)	17.11.2020	Supersedes PS 521 (06.03.2009).
PS 522	Audit of Credit Risk and Lending Business of Credit Institutions	01.10.2002	Standard current version date.
**EPS 522 n.F.**	**Audit of Loss Provision for Credit Risks (Draft)**	**07.2025**	Draft version.
PS 525	Assessment of Risk Management in Credit Institutions	26.06.2010	Annulled (aufgehoben) on 02.03.2020.
**PS 526**	**Auditor's Duties under § 29 KWG**	**10.2023**	Standard current version date.
**PS 527**	**Audit of Measures to Prevent Money Laundering and Terrorism Financing**	**10.2024**	Standard current version date.
**EPS 528**	**Supervisory Audit of DORA Compliance in the Financial Sector (Draft)**	**08.2025**	Draft version.
PS 560	Audit of Loss Provision in Non-Life Insurance Companies	09.12.2004	Standard current version date.
PS 570	Assessment of Embedded Value Reports in Insurance Companies	11.03.2011	Standard current version date.
PS 580	Audit of a Solvency Overview (§ 35 Abs. 2 VAG)	08.11.2017	Standard current version date.
**EPS 590**	**Audit of Compliance with VAIT Requirements (VAIT Audit) (Draft)**	**07.2023**	Draft version.
PS 610 n.F.	Audit under the Energy Industry Act (§ 6b Abs. 5 EnWG) (New Version)	26.06.2020	Supersedes PS 610 (29.11.2012).
PS 611	Separate Audit based on BNetzA Determinations (§ 6b Abs. 6 i.V.m. § 29 EnWG)	09.06.2021	Standard current version date.
PS 650 n.F.	Expanded Scope of Hospital Audits (Landeskrankenhausrecht) (New Version)	31.03.2019	Supersedes PS 650 (27.11.2009).
PS 700	Audit of State Aid under Article 107 AEUV	29.11.2012	Standard current version date.
PS 710	Prüfung des Rechenschaftsberichts einer politischen Partei	12.05.2005	Standard current version date.
PS 720	Reporting on Expanded Audit Scope (§ 53 HGrG)	09.09.2010	Standard current version date.
PS 721 n.F.	Audit of Market Conformity (§ 43 Abs. 1 MStV) (New Version)	26.11.2020	Supersedes PS 721 (11.03.2010).
PS 730	Audit of Annual Financial Statements of Public Authorities	30.03.2012	Standard current version date.
PS 731	Audit of Proper Budget Management of Public Authorities	26.11.2020	Standard current version date.
PS 740	Audit of Foundations (*Stiftungen*)	25.02.2000	Standard current version date.
PS 750	Audit of Associations (*Vereine*)	09.09.2010	Standard current version date.
PS 800	Recommendations on Assessing Illiquidity	06.03.2009	Replaced by IDW S 11.
PS 810	Audit of the Net Asset Value Statement for Leasing Companies	06.12.2013	Standard current version date.
PS 821	Audit or Review of Sustainability Reports	06.09.2006	Annulled (aufgehoben) on 27.02.2020.
PS 830 n.F.	Audit of Developers/Construction Supervisors (MaBV) (New Version)	13.12.2018	Supersedes PS 830 (10.06.2011).
PS 840 n.F.	Audit of Financial Investment Brokers (FinVermV) (New Version)	12.12.2018	Supersedes PS 840 (05.03.2015).
PS 850	Project-Accompanying Audit for IT Use	02.09.2008	Standard current version date.
EPS 850 n.F.	Project-Accompanying Audit for IT Use (Draft)	26.03.2021	Draft version.
PS 860	IT Audit Outside the Financial Statement Audit	02.03.2018	Standard current version date.
**PS 861**	**Audit of AI Systems**	**03.2023**	Standard current version date.
**PS 870**	**Audit of the Remuneration Report (§ 162 Abs. 3 AktG)**	**09.2023**	Standard current version date.
EPS 870	Audit of the Remuneration Report (§ 162 Abs. 3 AktG) (Draft)	2021	Draft version.
PS 880	Audit of Software Products	11.03.2010	Standard current version date.
EPS 880 n.F.	Audit of Software Products (Draft)	26.03.2021	Draft version.
PS 890	Performance of WebTrustSM/TH Engagements	08.03.2001	Annulled (aufgehoben) on 27.02.2020.

=== E. Other Attestation and Review Services (PS 900–999) ===
IDW PS: Other Attestation and Review Services
IDW PS/EPS	Title (English Translation - Abbreviated)	Status/Date	Application/Note
PS 900	Principles for the Review of Financial Statements	01.10.2002	Standard current version date.
**EPS 901**	**Review of Reconciliation Statements (Tax Interest Limitation Rule)**	**06.03.2009**	Annulled (aufgehoben) on 06.06.2012.
**EPS 902**	**Review of Target-Actual Comparison for Investment Performance**	**07.09.2012**	Annulled (aufgehoben) on 12.08.2015.
PS 910	Principles for Issuing a Comfort Letter	04.03.2004	Standard current version date.
PS 920	Audit of Systems under § 20 WpHG (Non-Financial Counterparties)	24.11.2016	Standard current version date.
PS 951 n.F.	Audit of the Internal Control System at Service Organizations (New Version)	26.03.2021	For examinations with reporting periods beginning on or after **15.12.2021**.
PS 970	Audits under the Renewable Energy Sources Act (EEG)	06.09.2012	Standard current version date.
EPS 970 n.F.	Other Audits related to Energy Law (Draft)	15.02.2016	Draft version.
PS 971	Audits under the Combined Heat and Power Generation Act (KWKG)	26.11.2013	Standard current version date.
PS 980	Principles for the Proper Audit of Compliance Management Systems (CMS)	11.03.2011	Standard current version date.
PS 981	Principles for the Proper Audit of Risk Management Systems (RMS)	03.03.2017	Standard current version date.
PS 982	Principles for the Proper Audit of the Internal Control System for Reporting	03.03.2017	Standard current version date.
PS 983	Principles for the Proper Audit of Internal Audit Systems	03.03.2017	Standard current version date.
**EPS 983 n.F.**	**Principles for the Proper Audit of Internal Audit Systems (New Draft)**	**06.2025**	Draft version.
**EPS 990**	**Substantive Audit with Reasonable Assurance of Non-Financial Reporting (Draft)**	**11.2022**	Draft version.
**EPS 991**	**Substantive Audit with Limited Assurance of Non-Financial Reporting (Draft)**	**11.2022**	Draft version.

== III. IDW Auditing Guidance Notes (IDW PH) ==
This section lists the IDW Prüfungshinweise (IDW PH), which provide detailed guidance for applying IDW Auditing Standards (IDW PS) and other relevant regulations.

=== A. General, Planning, and IT-Related PH (IDW PH 9.100 - 9.380) ===
IDW PH: General, Planning, and IT
IDW PH	Title (English Translation - Abbreviated)	Status/Date	Application/Note
9.100.1	Peculiarities of the Audit of Small and Medium-Sized Enterprises	29.11.2006	Standard current version date.
9.140	Checklists for Performing Quality Control	09.06.2017	Standard current version date.
9.200.1	Duties of the Auditor of a Subsidiary and the Group Auditor regarding § 264 Para. 3 HGB	19.06.2013	Standard current version date.
9.200.2	Duties of the Auditor of a Subsidiary/Joint Venture and the Group Auditor regarding § 285 No. 17 HGB	19.06.2013	Standard current version date.
9.302.1	Third-Party Confirmations in Credit and Financial Services Institutions	03.11.2016	Standard current version date.
9.302.2	Third-Party Confirmations in Insurance Companies	12.05.2006	Standard current version date.
9.314.1*	Audit of Annual Consumption Accruals with Rolling Annual Consumption Reading in Utilities	13.09.2005	**Annulled** on 26.06.2020.
9.330.1	Checklist for the Audit when Information Technology is Used	01.07.2002	Standard current version date.
9.330.2	Audit of IT-Supported Business Processes within the Audit	24.08.2010	Standard current version date.
9.330.3	Use of Data Analytics within the Audit	15.10.2010	Standard current version date.
9.350.1	Impact of the Women's Quota Disclosure on the Audit Opinion and Audit Report	06.01.2017	Standard current version date.
9.350.2	Treatment of Non-Financial Reporting (§§ 289b to 289e, 315b, 315c HGB) by the Auditor	22.09.2020	Standard current version date.
9.380*	Audit Checklist for IT Adjustment to the Millennium Change	10.07.1998	**Annulled** on 08.12.2005.

=== B. Reporting and Communication PH (IDW PH 9.400 - 9.490) ===
IDW PH: Reporting and Communication
IDW PH	Title (English Translation - Abbreviated)	Status/Date	Application/Note
9.400.1	On Issuing the Audit Opinion for Hospitals	01.04.2008	Standard current version date.
9.400.2	Auditor's Report on the Annual Report of a Special Fund (§ 102 KAGB)	03.09.2014	Standard current version date.
9.400.3	On Issuing the Audit Opinion for Municipal Enterprises	16.09.2020	Supersedes 19.06.2013 version.
9.400.4*	Audit Opinions/Certificates for Group Financial Statements in IPOs (Neuer Markt)	05.03.2002	**Annulled** (reasons for annulment in FN-IDW 2002, S. 597, S. 666).
9.400.5	Audit Opinion for Audits of Liquidation Opening Balance Sheets	01.03.2006	Standard current version date.
9.400.6	Audit of Annual and Interim Financial Statements for Capital Increases from Company Funds	09.09.2010	Standard current version date.
9.400.7	Auditor's Report on the Dissolution Report of a Special Fund (§ 44 Abs. 6 InvestmentG)	03.09.2014	Standard current version date.
9.400.8	Audit of a Preliminary IFRS Group Opening Balance Sheet	01.03.2006	Standard current version date.
9.400.10*	Auditor's Report on the Non-Consideration of Voting Rights (§ 23 Abs. 1 WpHG)	01.03.2006	**Annulled** (reasons for annulment in FN-IDW 2007, S. 262).
9.400.11	Impact of Error Findings by the DPR/BaFin on the Audit Opinion	06.09.2006	Standard current version date.
9.400.12	Auditor's Report on the Interim Report of a Special Fund (§ 44 Abs. 6 InvestmentG)	03.09.2014	Standard current version date.
9.400.13	Auditor's Report on the Annual Financial Statements/Management Report of an Investment Stock Corporation (§ 121 Abs. 2 KAGB)	10.09.2019	Applies to reporting periods beginning on or after **15.12.2018**. (Supersedes 03.09.2014 version).
9.400.14	Auditor's Report on the Liquidation Report of a Special Fund (§ 105 Abs. 3 KAGB)	03.09.2014	Standard current version date.
9.400.15	Auditor's Report/Opinion on the Annual Financial Statements/Management Report of an Investment Limited Partnership (§§ 136, 159 KAGB) and Companies (§ 47 KAGB)	18.02.2015	Standard current version date.
9.400.16	Auditor's Opinion on the Annual Financial Statements/Management Report of an Issuer of Financial Assets (§ 25 VermAnlG)	18.02.2015	Standard current version date.
9.420.1	Reporting on the Audit of Lump-Sum Subsidies under State Hospital Law	04.09.2008	Standard current version date.
9.420.2*	Auditor's Certificate on the Calculation of the Operating Result and its Use (§ 12 WVO)	16.09.2003	**Superseded** by the 15.01.2020 version.
9.420.2	Auditor's Opinion on the Calculation of the Operating Result and its Use (§ 12 WVO)	15.01.2020	Supersedes 16.09.2003 version.
9.420.3*	Audits under the Combined Heat and Power Generation Act (KWKG) and Renewable Energy Sources Act (EEG)	30.03.2007	**Replaced** by IDW PS 970 and IDW PS 971.
9.420.4	Auditor's Report pursuant to § 17a Abs. 7 S. 2 KHG	22.11.2006	Standard current version date.
9.430.1	Peculiarities in the Audit of the Annual Accounts of Statutory Health Insurance Providers	29.10.2012	Standard current version date.
9.450.1*	Reporting on the Audit of Public Enterprises	10.04.2000	**Annulled** on 16.09.2020.
9.450.2	On the Reproduction of the Audit Opinion in the Audit Report	08.03.2006	Standard current version date.
9.490.1	Peculiarities in the Audit of a Final Balance Sheet	10.08.2015	Standard current version date.

=== C. Sector-Specific and Special Attestation PH (IDW PH 9.500 - 9.999) ===
IDW PH: Sector-Specific and Special Attestation
IDW PH	Title (English Translation - Abbreviated)	Status/Date	Application/Note
9.520.1	Annual Audit of Financial Services Institutions considering Supervisory Requirements	08.11.2011	Supersedes IDW PS 520.
9.522.1	Consideration of Real Estate Collateral in the Audit of the Value of Default-Prone Receivables at Credit Institutions	07.07.2005	Standard current version date.
9.720.1	Assessment of the Adequacy of Equity Capital of Public Enterprises	09.09.2010	Standard current version date.
9.720.2	Relationship between the Annual Audit of Municipal Enterprises and Local/Supra-local Audits	12.05.2016	Standard current version date.
9.860.1	Audit of Principles, Procedures, and Measures under the EU-GDPR and Federal Data Protection Act	19.06.2018	Standard current version date.
9.860.2	Audit of Measures to be Implemented by Operators of Critical Infrastructures (§ 8a Abs. 1 BSIG)	21.06.2019	Standard current version date.
9.860.3	Audit of Cloud Services	15.05.2020	Standard current version date.
9.860.4	Audit of Compliance with Principles for Proper Management and Retention of Electronic Books/Records (GoBD-Compliance)	14.06.2021	Standard current version date.
9.900.1*	Review of Pro Forma Information	01.10.2002	**Replaced** by IDW PH 9.960.1.
9.910.1	Audit of Earnings Forecasts and Estimates (i.S. of IDW RH HFA 2.003)	14.02.2020	Standard current version date.
9.950.1	Audit of Reports on Types and Quantities of Electrical/Electronic Equipment to the Stiftung EAR	11.04.2007	Standard current version date.
9.950.2	Peculiarities in the Audit of a REIT-Stock Corporation, Pre-REIT-Stock Corporation, and Audit under § 21 Abs. 3 S. 3 REIT-Gesetz	25.10.2010	Standard current version date.
9.950.3*	Audit of the "Statement of Completeness" for Sales Packaging Placed on the Market	29.01.2010	**Annulled** and **replaced** by IDW PH 9.910.1.
9.960.1	Audit of Pro Forma Financial Information	12.07.2017	Supersedes IDW PH 9.900.1.
9.960.2	Audit of Additional Financial Statement Elements	30.01.2006	Standard current version date.
9.960.3	Audit of Earnings Forecasts and Estimates (i.S.v. IDW RH HFA 2.003) and Confirmation of Estimates based on Preliminary Figures	14.02.2014	Standard current version date.
9.970.1*	Peculiarities of the Audit regarding the Application for Special Equalization Scheme under EEG 2014 (2014 Application Year)	30.07.2014	**Replaced** by IDW PH 9.970.10 and IDW PH 9.970.14.
9.970.2*	Auditor's Report on the Audit of the Summarized Final Settlement of a Grid Operator (§ 75 S. 1 EEG 2014, 2014 Calendar Year)	13.01.2015	**Replaced** by IDW PH 9.970.11.
9.970.3*	Auditor's Report on the Audit of the Final Settlement of an Electricity Supply Company (§ 75 S. 2 EEG 2014, 2014 Calendar Year)	13.01.2015	**Replaced** by IDW PH 9.970.12.
9.970.4*	Audit pursuant to § 19 Abs. 2 S. 15 StromNEV i.V.m. § 9 Abs. 6 S. 2 KWKG of the Annual Settlement of a Grid Operator (2014 Calendar Year)	13.01.2015	**Replaced** by IDW PH 9.970.30.
9.970.5*	Peculiarities of the Audit regarding the Application for Special Equalization Scheme under EEG 2014 (2015 Application Year)	24.02.2015	**Replaced** by IDW PH 9.970.10 and IDW PH 9.970.14.
9.970.6*	Audit of Additional Costs Incurred by a Grid Operator due to Retrofitting (SysStabV)	24.02.2015	**Annulled** on 15.08.2019.
9.970.10	Peculiarities of the Audit regarding the Application for Special Equalization Scheme by Power-Intensive Companies under EEG 2021 (2021 Application Year)	09.04.2021	Supersedes previous versions for power-intensive companies.
9.970.11	Peculiarities of the Audit of the Summarized Final Settlement of a Grid Operator (§ 75 S. 1 EEG 2021, 2020 Calendar Year)	19.03.2020	Supersedes previous versions for grid operators' final settlements.
9.970.12	Peculiarities of the Audit of Settlements of Electricity Suppliers, Power-Intensive Companies, etc. (§ 75 S. 2 EEG 2021, § 30 Abs. 1 Nr. KWKG 2020, etc., 2020 Calendar Year)	19.03.2021	Supersedes previous versions for various settlements.
9.970.13*	Peculiarities of the Audit of the Final Settlement of a Self-Supplier (§ 75 S. 2 EEG 2014, 2014/2015 Calendar Years)	29.02.2016	**Annulled** on 02.03.2017.
9.970.14	Peculiarities of the Audit regarding the Application for Special Equalization Scheme by Rail Operators under EEG 2021	20.05.2021	Supersedes previous versions for rail operators.
9.970.15	Peculiarities of the Audit of Financial Statements for Independent Business Units (§ 64 Abs. 5 EEG 2017) for Special Equalization Scheme Application	13.05.2019	Standard current version date.
9.970.16	Peculiarities of the Audit regarding the Application for Special Equalization Scheme by Transport Companies with Electric Buses under EEG 2021	21.06.2021	Standard current version date.
9.970.30	Peculiarities of the Audit of the Annual Settlement of Lost Grid Fee Revenues of a Grid Operator (§ 19 Abs. 2 S. 15 StromNEV i.V.m. § 30 Abs. 1 Nr. 7 KWKG 2016, 2020 Calendar Year)	18.12.2020	Supersedes previous versions for lost grid fee revenues.
9.970.31	Peculiarities of the Audit regarding the Application for Funding of Heating/Cooling Networks (§ 30 Abs. 1 Nr. 3 KWKG 2020)	17.03.2021	Standard current version date.
9.970.32	Peculiarities of the Audit regarding the Application for Funding of Heat/Cold Storage Systems (§ 30 Abs. 1 Nr. 4 KWKG 2020)	17.03.2021	Standard current version date.
9.970.33	Peculiarities of the Audit of the Settlements of a Grid Operator (§ 30 Abs. 1 Nr. 9 KWKG, 2019 Calendar Year)	17.04.2020	Standard current version date.
9.970.34	Peculiarities of the Audit of Settlements and Proofs of Operators of KWKG Plants/Innovative KWK Systems (§ 30 Abs. 1 Nr. 1/2 KWKG 2020, § 20 Abs. 2 S. 2 KWKAusV)	19.02.2021	Standard current version date.
9.970.35*	Peculiarities of the Audit regarding the Limitation of the StromNEV Levy/Offshore Liability Levy	30.10.2017	**Superseded** by the 12.07.2021 version.
9.970.35	Peculiarities of the Audit regarding the Limitation of the StromNEV Levy (§ 19 Abs. 2 S. 15 StromNEV i.V.m. § 30 Abs. 1 Nr. 5 KWKG 2016)	12.07.2021	Supersedes 30.10.2017 version.
9.970.60	Peculiarities of the Audit of the Price Limit Comparison for Electricity at the Level of the Final Consumer (§ 2 Abs. 6 S. 3 i.V.m. Abs. 4 KAV)	30.10.2018	Standard current version date.
9.970.61	Peculiarities of the Audit of the Price Limit Comparison for Electricity at the Level of the Supplier (§ 2 Abs. 6 S. 3 i.V.m. Abs. 4 KAV)	30.10.2018	Standard current version date.
9.970.62	Peculiarities of the Audit of the Compilation of Electricity Quantities of a Reseller for Concession Fee Settlement (§ 2 Abs. 8 i.V.m. Abs. 6 S. 3 KAV)	30.10.2018	Standard current version date.
9.970.63	Peculiarities of the Audit of Electricity Deliveries during Off-Peak Times (Off-Peak Electricity) at the Level of the Supplier (§ 2 Abs. 6 S. 3 KAV)	30.10.2018	Standard current version date.
9.970.64	Peculiarities of the Audit of the Electricity Concession Fee Settlement with a Municipality	07.09.2020	Standard current version date.
9.970.80	Peculiarities of the Audit regarding the Application for a Grant by Railway Undertakings (Energy Efficiency of Electric Rail Traffic)	20.04.2020	Standard current version date.
9.980.1*	Individual Questions on the Audit of the Code of Conduct of the German Insurance Association (GDV) for the Distribution of Insurance Products	27.05.2016	Standard current version date.

== IV. IDW Questions and Answers on ISA/IDW PS (IDW F&A zu ISA/IDW PS) ==
This section lists the Q&A publications issued by the IDW to clarify the application of ISA [DE] and their counterpart German Auditing Standards (IDW PS/EPS).

IDW F&A: Questions and Answers on ISA and IDW Standards
IDW F&A	Reference Standard	Title (English Translation - Abbreviated)	Status/Date	Note
F & A zu ISA [DE]	ISA [DE]	On the Introduction of ISA [DE] and Individual Questions on the Application of Selected ISA [DE]	30.03.2020	Standard current version date.
F & A zu ISA 260 (Rev.) bzw. IDW EPS 470 n.F.	ISA 260 (Rev.) / IDW EPS 470 n.F.	On Communication with Those Charged with Governance (Aufsichtsorgan)	12.06.2017	Standard current version date.
F & A zu ISA 315 bzw. IDW PS 261 n.F.	ISA 315 / IDW PS 261 n.F.	On Risk Identification and Assessment	21.11.2014	Standard current version date.
F & A zur Anwendung von ATT i.R.d. Abschlussprüfung	ATT (Automated Tools and Techniques)	On the Practical Application of Automated Tools and Techniques (ATT) in the Audit	22.09.2020	Standard current version date.
F & A zu ISA 320 bzw. IDW PS 250 n.F.	ISA 320 / IDW PS 250 n.F.	On Determining Materiality and Tolerable Misstatement	11.05.2020	Supersedes the 25.07.2013 version.
F & A zu ISA 450 bzw. IDW PS 250 n.F.	ISA 450 / IDW PS 250 n.F.	On Evaluating Identified Misstatements	25.07.2013	Standard current version date.
F & A zu ISA 505 bzw. IDW PS 302 n.F.	ISA 505 / IDW PS 302 n.F.	On Obtaining Third-Party Confirmations	02.10.2015	Standard current version date.
F & A zu ISA 530 bzw. IDW EPS 310 oder ISA 500 bzw. IDW EPS 300 n.F.	ISA 530 / IDW EPS 310 or ISA 500 / IDW EPS 300 n.F.	On Performing Representative Selection (Sampling) or Directed Selection	20.11.2015	Standard current version date.
F & A zu ISA [DE] 540 (Revised)	ISA [DE] 540 (Revised)	On the Audit of Accounting Estimates	2021	Date is 2021 (from publication data).
F & A zu ISA [DE] 570 (Revised) bzw. IDW PS 270 n.F.	ISA 570 (Revised) / IDW PS 270 n.F.	The Use of Forecast Periods for Assessing Going Concern	2021	Date is 2021 (from publication data).
F & A zu ISA 600 bzw. IDW PS 320 n.F.	ISA 600 / IDW PS 320 n.F.	On the Practical Application of Group Audits	06.07.2015	Standard current version date.
F & A zu IDW PS 350 n.F.	IDW PS 350 n.F.	On the Audit of the Management Report (Lagebericht)	26.08.2019	Standard current version date.
F & A zu ISA 701 bzw. IDW EPS 401	ISA 701 / IDW EPS 401	On Reporting Key Audit Matters (KAM)	04.10.2017	Standard current version date.

== V. IDW Accounting Statements (IDW RS) ==
This section lists the IDW Stellungnahmen zur Rechnungslegung (IDW RS), which provide authoritative guidance on German GAAP (HGB) and IFRS accounting issues, categorized by the issuing technical committee.

=== A. IDW RS BFA (Bank Committee) ===
IDW RS BFA: Banking and Financial Institutions
IDW RS	Title (English Translation - Abbreviated)	Status/Date	Note
BFA 1	Accounting Treatment of Credit Derivatives in the Non-Trading Book	18.02.2015	Correction noted in FN-IDW 2004, S. 556.
BFA 2	Accounting for Financial Instruments in the Trading Book of Credit Institutions	03.03.2010	Standard current version date.
BFA 3	Individual Issues of Loss-Free Valuation of Interest-Related Transactions in the Banking Book (Interest Book)	30.08.2012	Superseded by BFA 3 n.F.
BFA 3 n.F.	Individual Issues of Loss-Free Valuation of Interest-Related Transactions in the Banking Book (Interest Book)	16.10.2017	Supersedes BFA 3 (2012).
BFA 4	Peculiarities of Foreign Currency Translation for Institutions under HGB	18.08.2011	Standard current version date.
BFA 5	HGB Accounting for Financial Futures and Forward Rate Agreements in Institutions	18.08.2011	Standard current version date.
BFA 6	HGB Accounting for Option Transactions in Institutions	18.08.2011	Standard current version date.
BFA 7	Risk Provision for Foreseeable, Not Yet Individually Specified Counterparty Credit Risks in the Lending Business ("Lump-Sum Write-Downs")	13.12.2019	Standard current version date.

=== B. IDW RS FAIT (IT Committee) ===
IDW RS FAIT: Information Technology
IDW RS	Title (English Translation - Abbreviated)	Status/Date	Note
FAIT 1	Principles of Proper Accounting when Using Information Technology	24.09.2002	Standard current version date.
FAIT 2	Principles of Proper Accounting when Using Electronic Commerce	29.09.2003	Standard current version date.
FAIT 3	Principles of Proper Accounting when Using Electronic Archiving Procedures	11.09.2015	Revised version (reissued 2015).
FAIT 4	Requirements for the Propriety and Security of IT-Supported Consolidation Processes	08.08.2012	Standard current version date.
FAIT 5	Principles of Proper Accounting for Outsourcing of Accounting-Relevant Processes and Functions including Cloud Computing	04.11.2015	Standard current version date.

=== C. IDW RS HFA (Main Committee) ===
IDW RS HFA: General and HGB/IFRS Accounting
IDW RS	Title (English Translation - Abbreviated)	Status/Date	Note
HFA 1*	Preparation of the Management Report (Lagebericht)	04.12.2001	**Annulled** on 07.07.2005.
HFA 2	Individual Questions on the Application of IAS	12.04.2017	Standard current version date.
HFA 3	HGB Accounting for Obligations from Partial Retirement Arrangements	19.06.2013	Standard current version date.
HFA 4	Questions on Recognition and Measurement of Provisions for Impending Losses	29.11.2012	Standard current version date.
HFA 5	Accounting for Foundations (Stiftungen)	06.12.2013	Standard current version date.
HFA 6	Amendment of Annual Financial Statements and Adjustment of the Commercial Balance Sheet to the Tax Balance Sheet	12.04.2007	Standard current version date.
HFA 7	Accounting for Partnerships (Personenhandelsgesellschaften)	06.02.2012	Superseded by HFA 7 n.F.
HFA 7 n.F.	HGB Accounting for Partnerships (Personenhandelsgesellschaften)	30.11.2017	Supersedes HFA 7 (2012).
HFA 8	Questions on Accounting for Asset Backed Securities and Similar Transactions	09.12.2003	Standard current version date.
HFA 9	Individual Questions on Accounting for Financial Instruments	13.05.2016	Standard current version date.
HFA 10	Application of IDW S 1 Principles in the Valuation of Holdings and Other Business Shares for the Purpose of an HGB Annual Financial Statement	29.11.2012	Standard current version date.
HFA 11	Accounting for Software by the User	23.06.2010	Superseded by HFA 11 n.F.
HFA 11 n.F.	Accounting for Acquired Software by the User	18.12.2017	Supersedes HFA 11 (2010).
HFA 12	Accounting for Political Parties	24.11.2016	Standard current version date.
ERS HFA 13 n.F.	Individual Questions on the Transfer of Economic Ownership and Revenue Recognition under HGB	29.11.2006	Draft version.
HFA 14	Accounting for Associations (Vereine)	06.12.2013	Standard current version date.
HFA 15	HGB Accounting for Emission Allowances	01.03.2006	Standard current version date.
HFA 16*	Valuations in the Context of Business Combinations and Impairment Testing under IFRS	18.10.2005	**Annulled** on 04.05.2015. **Replaced** by IDW RS HFA 40.
HFA 17	Impact of a Departure from the Going Concern Assumption on the HGB Annual Financial Statement	08.09.2016	Standard current version date.
HFA 18	Accounting for Shares in Partnerships in the HGB Annual Financial Statement	04.06.2014	Standard current version date.
HFA 19*	Individual Questions on the First-Time Application of IFRS according to IFRS 1	06.09.2006	**Annulled** on 15.12.2016.
ERS HFA 20*	Reporting on Organ Members' Remuneration (§ 285 Para. 1 No. 9a HGB, § 314 Para. 1 No. 6a HGB)	02.09.2008	**Annulled** on 02.09.2008.
HFA 21	Peculiarities of Accounting for Fundraising Organizations	11.03.2010	Standard current version date.
HFA 22	On the Uniform or Separate HGB Accounting for Structured Financial Instruments	11.09.2015	Revised version (reissued 2015).
HFA 23	Recognition and Measurement of Pension Obligations to Civil Servants and their Survivors	24.04.2009	Standard current version date.
HFA 24	Individual Questions on the Disclosure Requirements of IFRS 7 regarding Financial Instruments	10.07.2017	Standard current version date.
HFA 25	Individual Questions on Accounting for Contracts to Buy or Sell Non-Financial Items under IAS 39	06.03.2009	Standard current version date.
HFA 26	Individual Questions on Reclassification of Financial Assets (Amendments to IAS 39 and IFRIC 9)	09.09.2009	Standard current version date.
ERS HFA 27*	Individual Questions on Accounting for Deferred Taxes under HGB (BilMoG)	09.09.2010	**Annulled** on 09.09.2010.
HFA 28	Transitional Provisions of the Bilanzrechtsmodernisierungsgesetz (BilMoG)	09.09.2010	Standard current version date.
HFA 30	HGB Accounting for Pension Obligations	10.06.2011	Superseded by HFA 30 n.F.
HFA 30 n.F.	HGB Accounting for Pension Obligations	16.12.2016	Supersedes HFA 30 (2011).
HFA 31	Capitalization of Production Costs	23.06.2010	Superseded by HFA 31 n.F.
HFA 31 n.F.	Capitalization of Production Costs	18.12.2017	Supersedes HFA 31 (2010).
HFA 32	Notes Disclosures (§§ 285 No. 3, 314 Abs. 1 No. 2 HGB) regarding Off-Balance Sheet Transactions	09.09.2010	Standard current version date.
HFA 33	Notes Disclosures (§§ 285 No. 21, 314 Abs. 1 No. 13 HGB) regarding Transactions with Related Parties	09.09.2010	Standard current version date.
HFA 34	Individual Questions on HGB Accounting for Provisions for Liabilities	03.06.2015	Standard current version date.
HFA 35	HGB Accounting for Hedging Accounting (Bewertungseinheiten)	10.06.2011	Standard current version date.
HFA 36*	Notes Disclosures (§§ 285 No. 17, 314 Abs. 1 No. 9 HGB) regarding Auditor's Fees	11.03.2010	**Replaced** by IDW RS HFA 36 n.F.
HFA 36 n.F.	Notes Disclosures (§§ 285 No. 17 HGB, 314 Abs. 1 No. 9 HGB) regarding Auditor's Fees	08.09.2016	Applies to reporting periods beginning after **31.12.2016**.
HFA 37	Individual Questions on Accounting for Borrowing Costs under IAS 23	15.12.2016	Standard current version date.
HFA 38	Consistency of Recognition and Measurement in the HGB Annual Financial Statement	10.06.2011	Standard current version date.
HFA 39	Prior Year Figures in the HGB Annual Financial Statement	25.11.2011	Standard current version date.
HFA 40	Individual Questions on Impairment of Assets under IAS 36	14.06.2016	Supersedes IDW RS HFA 16.
HFA 41	Impact of a Change in Legal Form (Formwechsel) on the HGB Annual Financial Statement	06.09.2012	Standard current version date.
HFA 42	Impact of a Merger (Verschmelzung) on the HGB Annual Financial Statement	29.10.2012	Standard current version date.
HFA 43	Impact of a Spin-Off (Spaltung) on the HGB Annual Financial Statement	06.09.2012	Standard current version date.
HFA 44	Prior Year Figures in the HGB Consolidated Financial Statement and Consolidated Accounting for Changes in the Consolidation Group	30.11.2017	Supersedes 2012 version.
HFA 45	Individual Questions on the Presentation of Financial Instruments under IAS 32	11.03.2011	Standard current version date.
HFA 47	Individual Questions on Determining Fair Value under IFRS 13	06.12.2013	Standard current version date.
HFA 48	Individual Questions on Accounting for Financial Instruments under IFRS 9	11.09.2018	Standard current version date.
HFA 50	IFRS Module Publication	2021	Umbrella statement for IFRS Modules.
HFA 50 Modul IAS 19 – M 1	Accounting for Pension Commitments with Insurance-Type Funding in the Low-Interest Rate Environment	01.03.2017	Module under IDW RS HFA 50.
HFA 50 Modul IAS 19 – M 2	Transfer of Non-Financial Assets to a Fund (IAS D19.8) with Subsequent Lease-Back to the Sponsoring Entity	07.11.2017	Module under IDW RS HFA 50.
HFA 50 Modul IFRS 1 – M 1	Transition from Combined Financial Statements to IFRS Consolidated Financial Statements for a Business Segment (Extraction Method)	20.03.2020	Module under IDW RS HFA 50.
HFA 50 Modul IFRS 3 – M 1	Business Combinations using a Newly Established Company or Shell/Shelf Company without Operations	08.08.2018	Module under IDW RS HFA 50.
HFA 50 Modul IFRS 3 – M 2	Reorganizations and Business Combinations under Common Control using a Newly Established Company or Shell/Shelf Company without Operations	08.08.2018	Module under IDW RS HFA 50.
HFA 50 Modul IFRS 9 – M 1	Loan Commitments in connection with the Supply of Goods or Provision of Services	14.12.2017	Module under IDW RS HFA 50.
HFA 50 Modul IFRS 9 – M 2 (Draft)	Compatibility of the 'Held to Collect' Business Model with the Sale of Receivables in Factoring Agreements	07.11.2019	Draft Module under IDW RS HFA 50.
HFA 50 Modul IFRS 9 – M 3 (Draft)	Assessment of the Cash Flow Condition for Financial Instruments with Identical Contractual Terms but Different Acquisition Dates	07.11.2019	Draft Module under IDW RS HFA 50.
HFA 50 Modul IFRS 16 – M 1 (Draft)	Accounting for Hereditary Building Right Contracts (Erbbaurechtsverträge) under German Law	25.11.2019	Draft Module under IDW RS HFA 50.
HFA 50 Modul IFRS 16 – M 2 (Draft)	Accounting for Company Car Arrangements for Employees	25.11.2019	Draft Module under IDW RS HFA 50.
HFA 50 Modul IFRS 16 – M 3 (Draft)	Accounting for Tenant Loans from Real Estate Lease Agreements	25.11.2019	Draft Module under IDW RS HFA 50.

=== D. IDW RS IFA (Real Estate Committee) ===
IDW RS IFA: Real Estate
IDW RS	Title (English Translation - Abbreviated)	Status/Date	Note
IFA 1	Distinction between Maintenance Expenditure and Production Costs for Buildings in the HGB Commercial Balance Sheet	25.11.2013	Standard current version date.
IFA 2	Valuation of Property, Plant and Equipment Real Estate in the HGB Commercial Balance Sheet	27.04.2015	Standard current version date.

=== E. IDW RS KHFA (Hospital Committee) ===
IDW RS KHFA: Hospitals
IDW RS	Title (English Translation - Abbreviated)	Status/Date	Note
KHFA 1	Accounting for Hospitals	03.02.2011	Standard current version date.
KHFA 2	Calculation and Use of the Operating Result by Workshops for Disabled Persons (§ 12 Para. 4 and 5 WVO)	12.12.2012	Supersedes 2006 version.

=== F. IDW RS ÖFA (Public Sector Committee) ===
IDW RS ÖFA: Public Sector and Utilities
IDW RS	Title (English Translation - Abbreviated)	Status/Date	Note
ERS ÖFA 1	Accounting for Public Administration under Double-Entry Bookkeeping Principles	30.10.2001	Draft version.
ÖFA 2	Accounting for Energy Supply Companies under the Energy Industry Act (EnWG)	03.09.2013	Superseded by ERS ÖFA 2 n.F.
ERS ÖFA 2 n.F.	Accounting under § 6b Energy Industry Act (EnWG)	09.06.2021	Draft version. Supersedes ÖFA 2 (2013).
ÖFA 3	Peculiarities of Accounting for Energy Procurement and Sales Contracts in HGB Financial Statements of Energy Supply Companies	24.08.2015	Standard current version date.

=== G. IDW RS VFA (Insurance Committee) ===
IDW RS VFA: Insurance
IDW RS	Title (English Translation - Abbreviated)	Status/Date	Note
VFA 1*	Valuation and Disclosure of Securities and Registered Bonds in the Annual Financial Statements of Insurance Companies	17.12.1999	Annulled (reason for annulment in FN-IDW 2000, S. 6).
VFA 2	Interpretation of § 341b HGB (new)	08.04.2002	Standard current version date.
VFA 3	Valuation of the Claims Provision of Non-Life Insurance Companies	01.03.2010	Standard current version date.

=== H. IDW RS WFA (Housing Industry Committee) ===
IDW RS WFA: Housing Industry
IDW RS	Title (English Translation - Abbreviated)	Status/Date	Note
WFA 1*	Consideration of Structural Vacancy in Residential Buildings Intended for Rent	24.04.2002	Standard current version date.

== VI. IDW Accounting Notes (IDW RH) ==
This section lists the IDW Rechnungslegungshinweise (IDW RH), which are specific accounting guidance notes, categorized by the issuing technical committee.

=== A. IDW RH BFA (Bank Committee) ===
IDW RH BFA: Banking and Financial Institutions
IDW RH	Title (English Translation - Abbreviated)	Status/Date	Note
BFA 1.001	Accounting Treatment of Bond Stripping	08.11.2011	Standard current version date.
BFA 1.003*	On Accounting for Structured Products	02.07.2001	**Replaced** by IDW RS HFA 22.

=== B. IDW RH HFA (Main Committee) and FAB (Reporting Committee) ===
IDW RH HFA/FAB: General and HGB/IFRS Accounting Notes
IDW RH	Title (English Translation - Abbreviated)	Status/Date	Note
HFA 1.001*	End of the Subsequent Events Period for the Preparation and Audit of a First-Time IAS Financial Statement	25.02.2000	Annulled (reason for annulment in FN-IDW 2000, S. 51).
HFA 1.002*	Impact of Split Corporate Tax Rate on Accounting for Deferred Taxes under IAS 12	01.09.2000	**Annulled** on 30.06.2004.
HFA 1.003*	First-Time IAS Application in the Quarterly Financial Statement	18.01.2002	**Annulled** on 30.06.2004.
HFA 1.004	Preparation of Pro Forma Financial Information	29.11.2005	Standard current version date.
HFA 1.005	Notes Disclosures (§ 285 Para. 1 No. 18 and 19 HGB) on Certain Financial Instruments	08.06.2018	Supersedes 2010 version.
HFA 1.006*	Notes Disclosures (§ 285 Para. 1 No. 17 HGB, § 314 Para. 1 No. 9 HGB) regarding Auditor's Fees	18.10.2005	**Replaced** by IDW RS HFA 36.
HFA 1.007*	Management Report Reporting (§ 289 Para. 1 and 3 HGB, § 315 Para. 1 HGB) in the version of the Accounting Law Reform Act	18.10.2005	**Annulled** on 18./19.09.2018.
HFA 1.008*	Reporting (§ 289 Para. 4 HGB, § 315 Para. 4 HGB) in the version of the Takeover Directive Implementation Act	29.11.2006	**Annulled** on 01./02.09.2018.
HFA 1.009	Provisions for the Retention of Business Documents, and for the Preparation, Audit, and Publication of Financial Statements and Management Reports (§ 249 Para. 1 HGB)	23.06.2010	Standard current version date.
HFA 1.010	Inventory Taking in Insolvency Proceedings	13.06.2008	Standard current version date.
HFA 1.011	Insolvency-Specific Accounting in Insolvency Proceedings	13.06.2008	Standard current version date.
HFA 1.012	External (HGB) Accounting in Insolvency Proceedings	11.09.2015	Supersedes 2008 version.
HFA 1.013	HGB Note and Reporting Requirements for Letters of Comfort (Patronatserklärungen)	22.02.2008	Standard current version date.
HFA 1.014	Reclassification and Valuation of Receivables and Securities under HGB	09.01.2009	Standard current version date.
HFA 1.015	Admissibility of Declining-Balance Depreciation in the HGB Commercial Balance Sheet	27.11.2009	Standard current version date.
HFA 1.016	HGB Admissibility of Component-Based Scheduled Depreciation of Property, Plant and Equipment	29.05.2009	Standard current version date.
HFA 1.017	Individual Questions on the Treatment of VAT in the HGB Annual Financial Statement	10.06.2011	Standard current version date.
HFA 1.018	Uniform Recognition and Measurement in the HGB Consolidated Financial Statements	13.03.2013	Standard current version date.
HFA 1.019	HGB Consolidated Accounting with Different Reporting Dates	13.03.2013	Standard current version date.
HFA 2.001	Disclosure and Presentation Requirements for Interest Rate Swaps in IFRS Financial Statements	19.09.2007	Standard current version date.
HFA 2.002	Individual Questions on the Preparation of Financial Information according to the Prospectus Regulation	21.04.2008	Standard current version date.
HFA 2.003	Preparation of Earnings Forecasts and Estimates according to the Prospectus Regulation and Earnings Estimates based on Preliminary Figures	14.02.2014	Supersedes 2008 version.
FAB 1.020	HGB Accounting Consequences of the Change of Certain Reference Interest Rates ("IBOR Reform") for Financial Instruments	26.09.2019	Standard current version date.
FAB 1.021	HGB Valuation of Provisions for Pension Obligations from Direct Commitments Covered by Insurance	30.04.2021	Standard current version date.

=== C. IDW RH IFA (Real Estate Committee) ===
IDW RH IFA: Real Estate
IDW RH	Title (English Translation - Abbreviated)	Status/Date	Note
IFA 1.001	Peculiarities of HGB Accounting for Deferred Taxes in Housing Companies	25.10.2010	Standard current version date.

=== D. IDW RH VFA (Insurance Committee) ===
IDW RH VFA: Insurance
IDW RH	Title (English Translation - Abbreviated)	Status/Date	Note
VFA 1.001*	Disclosure of Fair Values (§§ 54 ff. RechVersV) for "Zero-Schuldscheindarlehen" or "Zero-Namensschuldverschreibungen"	24.03.2000	**Annulled** on 17.01.2020.

=== E. IDW RH KHFA (Hospital Committee) ===
IDW RH KHFA: Hospitals
IDW RH	Title (English Translation - Abbreviated)	Status/Date	Note
KHFA 1.001*	On Accounting for the Maintenance Flat Rate (§ 17 Abs. 4b KHG)	08.03.2001	**Annulled** on 05.06.2008.
KHFA 1.002	Accounting Consequences of Equalization Amounts Contained in the State Base Case Value	23.05.2011	Standard current version date.

== VII. IDW Standards (IDW S) ==
This section lists the IDW Standards (IDW S), which provide authoritative guidance on general, non-audit-related topics like business valuation, restructuring, and insolvency.

IDW S: Non-Audit Standards
IDW S	Title (English Translation - Abbreviated)	Status/Date	Note
S 1 (2008 version)	Principles for the Performance of Business Valuations	04.07.2016	Supersedes 2008 version for reissuance date.
S 2*	Requirements for Insolvency Plans	10.02.2000	Superseded by S 2 (2019 version).
S 2	Requirements for Insolvency Plans	19.11.2019	Supersedes S 2 (2000 version).
S 4	Principles for the Proper Appraisal of Statutory Sales Documents for Alternative Investment Funds	24.05.2016	Standard current version date.
S 5	Principles for the Valuation of Intangible Assets	16.04.2015	Supersedes 2011 version.
S 6	Requirements for Restructuring Concepts	16.05.2018	Supersedes 2012 version.
S 7	Principles for the Preparation of Annual Financial Statements	27.11.2009	Reissued in 2021.
S 8	Principles for the Preparation of Fairness Opinions	17.01.2011	Standard current version date.
S 9	Certificate according to § 270b InsO	18.08.2014	Superseded by IDW ES 9 n.F.
ES 9 n.F.	Certificates according to §§ 270d and 270a InsO	12.01.2021	Draft version. Supersedes IDW S 9.
S 10	Principles for the Valuation of Real Estate	14.08.2013	Standard current version date.
S 11	Assessment of the Existence of Grounds for the Opening of Insolvency Proceedings	22.08.2016	Superseded by IDW ES 11 n.F.
ES 11 n.F.	Assessment of the Existence of Grounds for the Opening of Insolvency Proceedings	08.01.2021	Draft version. Supersedes IDW S 11.
S 12	Valuation of Holdings in a Real Estate Company (§ 250 Para. 1 No. 2 and § 236 Para. 1 KAGB)	02.02.2016	Standard current version date.
S 13	Peculiarities in Business Valuation for Determining Claims in Family and Inheritance Law	06.04.2016	Standard current version date.
S 14	Principles for the Proper Appraisal of Statutory Sales Documents for Publicly Offered Investments (Vermögensanlagen)	09.07.2018	Standard current version date.

== VIII. IDW Q&A on Standards (F&A zu IDW S) ==
This section lists Questions and Answers providing practical clarification for the IDW S (Non-Audit Standards).

IDW F&A zu IDW S: Q&A on Standards
IDW F&A	Reference Standard	Title (English Translation - Abbreviated)	Status/Date	Note
F&A zu IDW S 1 i.d.F. 2008	IDW S 1	Q&A: On the Practical Application of Principles for Business Valuations	14.10.2020	Standard current version date.
F & A zu IDW S 6	IDW S 6	Q&A: On the Preparation and Assessment of Restructuring Concepts	22.08.2016	Standard current version date.

---

== IX. IDW Quality Control Standards (IDW QS) ==
This section lists the IDW Standards for Quality Control.

IDW QS: Quality Control Standards
IDW QS	Title (English Translation - Abbreviated)	Status/Date	Note
QS 1	Requirements for Quality Control in Auditing Practices	09.06.2017	Standard current version date.

---

== X. IDW Tax Notes (IDW Steuerhinweis) ==
This section lists IDW Guidance on Tax Issues.

IDW Steuerhinweis: Tax Guidance
IDW Steuerhinweis	Title (English Translation - Abbreviated)	Status/Date	Note
1/2010	Determining the Equity Ratio for Purposes of the Interest Deduction Limitation (Zinsschranke) (§ 4h EStG)	01.03.2010	Standard current version date.

---

== XI. IDW Practice Notes (IDW Praxishinweis) ==
This section lists IDW Practice Notes, which address current practical issues in auditing and advisory.

IDW Praxishinweis: Practice Notes
IDW Praxishinweis	Title (English Translation - Abbreviated)	Status/Date	Note
1/2010	Expert Opinion by an Auditor on the Implementation of § 87 AktG (Management Board Remuneration)	08.10.2010	Standard current version date.
1/2012*	Valuation according to § 68, § 70 InvG	10.08.2012	**Replaced** by IDW S 12.
2/2012	Recommendations for the Design of Internal Security Measures for Anti-Money Laundering (AML) Prevention	06.09.2012	Superseded by 2/2012 i.d.F. 2020.
2/2012 i.d.F. 2020	Recommendations for the Design of Internal Security Measures for Anti-Money Laundering (AML) Prevention	06.10.2020	Supersedes 2/2012 (2012 version).
1/2014	Peculiarities in Determining an Objective Business Value for Small and Medium-Sized Enterprises	05.02.2014	Standard current version date.
1/2016	Design and Audit of a Tax Compliance Management System (CMS) according to IDW PS 980	31.07.2017	Standard current version date.
1/2017	Preparation of (Group) Payment Reports	21.12.2017	Supersedes 2017 version.
2/2017	Assessment of Business Planning in Valuation, Restructuring, Due Diligence, and Fairness Opinions	02.10.2017	Standard current version date.
1/2018	Goal-Oriented Derivation of Indicators for Controlling and Monitoring Audit Quality within the Quality Management Process (IDW QS 1)	09.08.2018	Standard current version date.
2/2018	Consideration of the Debt Ratio in Business Valuation	12.09.2018	Standard current version date.
1/2021	Guidance on the Audit of Financial Investment Intermediaries according to IDW PS 840 n.F. (FinVermV)	22.04.2021	Standard current version date.
