= Huw Jenkins =

English businessman

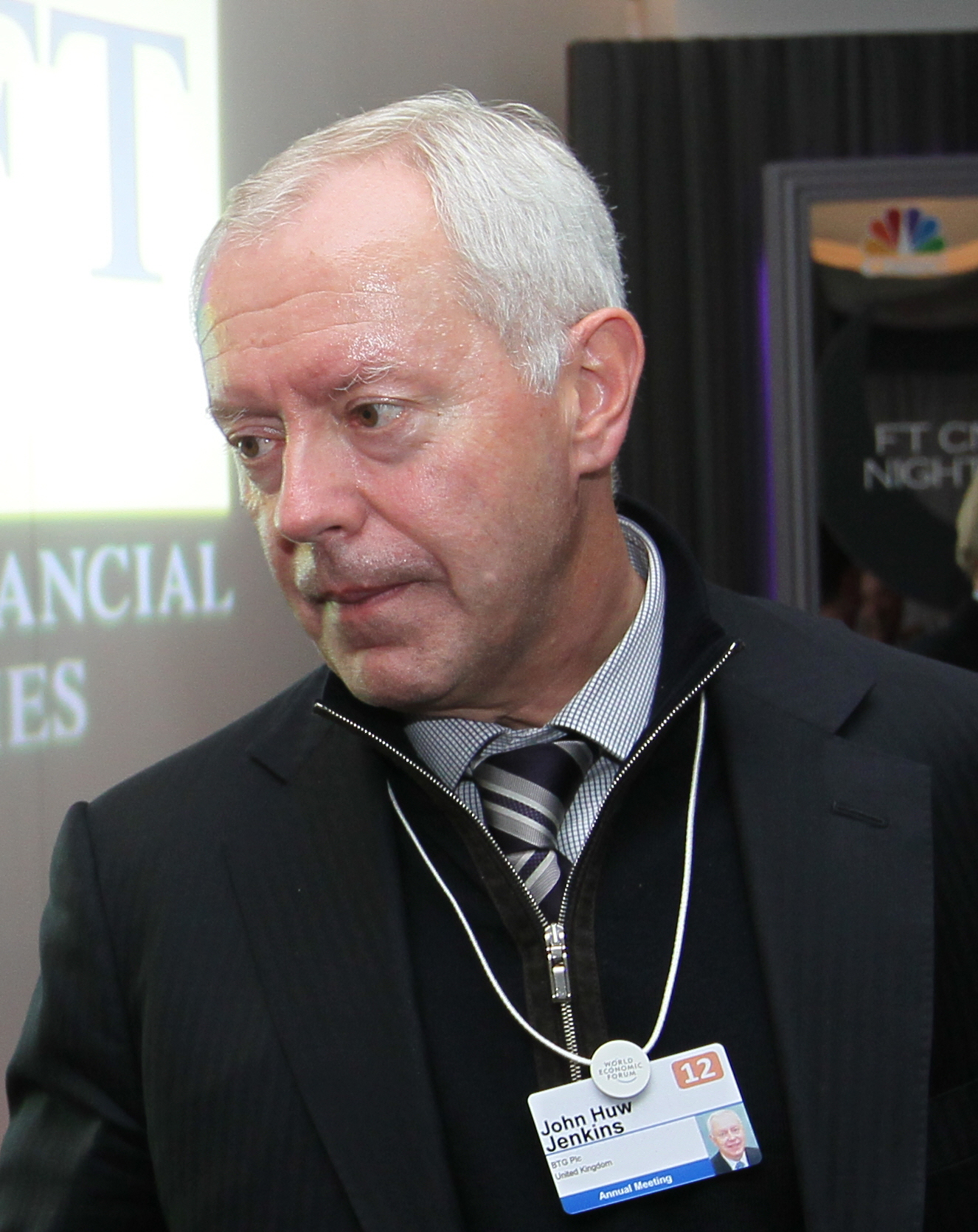
Huw Jenkins at the Financial Times CNBC Davos Nightcap, 26 January 2012

Huw Jenkins is a British businessman, currently vice chairman of the board of BTG Pactual, based in London. He is a managing partner of the firm as well as a member of the Global Management Committee. Jenkins is also chairman of Engelhart Commodities Trading Partners (ECTP), formerly known as BTG Pactual Commodities, which was spun out of BTG Pactual in 2016.

Jenkins joined BTG Pactual as a consultant in 2009 and became a partner in 2010. Prior to BTG he held several positions at UBS Investment Bank, including chairman and chief executive officer, global head of equities, head of equities for the Americas and head of Asia-Pacific equities. Prior to joining UBS, he worked at Barclays de Zoete Wedd and Hill Samuel.

== Education ==
Jenkins received his bachelor's degree with honours in sociology and psychology from the University of Liverpool, and his MBA from the London Business School. He has recently participated in the Executives in Residence programme at the London Business School.

== Career ==
Based at BTG Pactual's London office since late 2009, Jenkins is responsible for the international businesses. In 2010 BTG Pactual raised $1.8bn from a group of prestigious investors including Government of Singapore Investment Corporation (GIC), China Investment Corporation (CIC), Ontario Teachers' Pension Plan (OTPP), Abu Dhabi Investment Council (ADIC), J.C. Flowers & Co, RIT Capital Partners and Lord Rothschild’s family interests, the Santo Domingo Group, EXOR, the investment company controlled by the Agnelli family, and Inversiones Bahia, the holding company of the Motta family.

Prior to joining BTG Pactual, Jenkins worked at UBS Investment Bank (1996-2008). Jenkins joined the firm in 1996 as head of Asian Equities. In 1997 he was appointed co-head of Asia Pacific Equities and in 1998 head of Asia Pacific Equities. In 1999 he became co-head of US Equities and in 2000 he was appointed head of Equities for the Americas and later UBS's global head of Equities. Jenkins was appointed CEO of UBS Investment Bank in July 2005 and chairman and CEO of UBS Investment Bank in January 2006, holding these posts until September 2007. During Jenkins time as CEO, he expanded the fixed income risk of UBS. After UBS began to suffer losses in the subprime mortgage crisis Jenkins stepped down to an advisory role in October 2007. Other companies where Jenkins has been employed include: Barclays de Zoete Wedd (1987-1996), Hill Samuel (1986-1987) and HSBC (1981-1984).

After leaving UBS Investment Bank in 2008, Jenkins purchased a farm in Tuscany and spent his time "farming olives, producing an annual 5,000 litres of olive oil, even selling it alongside his wife from a stall on King’s Road in London’s Chelsea district".

=== LIBOR rigging investigation ===
At the United Kingdom's Parliamentary Commission on Banking Standards (PCBS), which is headed by the Archbishop of Canterbury of the Anglican Communion, Justin Welby, as well as Conservative MP Andrew Tyrie, four UBS witnesses, including Jenkins as the CEO of UBS Investment Bank, were invited by the PCBS to give testimony about the failure to detect rigging of the London Interbank Offered Rate (LIBOR), which resulted in the bank being fined $1.5 billion.

The PCBS found that "Libor [was] being manipulated for years." Closing the proceedings, Andrew Tyrie told the UBS executives that "You were ignorant and out of your depth." Jenkins stated in his testimony that "It [Libor fixing] was a very engrained part of the business areas, so it would not surprise me if it was going on before that [for many years]. I'm clearly deeply sorry we didn't spot this. It is clearly a failing in our systems and controls and our culture that it wasn't highlighted." After the PCBS hearings had ended, Jenkins submitted a letter to the PCBS, making it clear that the closing comments made by the Chairman had not been levelled against him individually. He rejected the charge of incompetence and pointed out that several investigations, including those led by the U.S. Department of Justice and U.K. Financial Standards Authority, had concluded he had no knowledge of the practice of rate rigging.

=== Fraudulent misrepresentation claim by former BGT Pactual Asia Ltd employee ===
An ex-employee of Hong Kong subsidiary BGT Pactual Asia Ltd, Zeljko Ivic, filed a claim in late 2013 alleging Jenkins and Banco BTG Pactual SA CEO André Esteves made fraudulent misrepresentations to induce him to sign agreements with Banco BTG Pactual SA. Ivic claimed he had played a key role in Banco BTG Pactual SA's IPO, raising funds from nine entities, including the China Investment Corporation, GIC Private Limited, as well as the Agnelli and Rothschild families, for which he was promised a partnership and shares. Ivic valued his claim at some US$20 million. He started proceedings after being dismissed in October 2013. Jenkins was reported to have been served a writ in the case during a Hong Kong visit.

As of February 15, 2017 the case was still ongoing. BTG Pactual has said that he is a disgruntled former employee and that his claim is completely without merit.

=== Pactual sale to UBS Investment Bank and resale to BTG ===
Arthur Rutishauser in SonntagsZeitung argued that the way André Esteves acquired 27% of his bank is an example of an insider case: Esteves sold the bank in 2006 for 3.1 billion Swiss Francs to UBS, where at that time Jenkins was a key decision maker, and heavily involved in that transaction. Suffering financial constraints linked to the credit crisis, UBS put Pactual up for sale in 2009 as part of an effort to reduce its risk profile and improve its balance sheet. Esteves repurchased Pactual in 2009 for 2.5 billion Swiss Francs after being allowed to leave UBS to set up BTG. Jenkins left UBS in 2008, and subsequently joined BTG Pactual in 2009 as a consultant, becoming a partner and board member at BTG Pactual in 2010.

=== BTG Pactual purchase of BSI ===
On 14 July 2014, BTG Pactual purchased Banca della Svizzera Italiana (BSI), with the purchase being subject to approval by the Swiss Financial Market Supervisory Authority (FINMA). The CEO of FINMA is Mark Branson who was previously the CEO of UBS Securities Japan Ltd. Branson reported directly to Jenkins, the CEO of UBS Investment Bank and who is now a partner and director of BTG Pactual. Branson also worked alongside André Esteves, now CEO of BTG Pactual while both worked at UBS in its management committee in November 2007 during which time Andre Esteves allegedly committed insider trades. Esteves settled the claim brought by the Italian financial regulator in April 2012. BTG Pactual announced February 22, 2016 that it had entered into a definitive agreement under which EFG International would acquire BSI. FINMA subjected the transaction to a rigorous review, and it was approved on May 26, 2016. BTG Pactual maintains a minority stake in EFG International.

== Charitable activities ==
Jenkins served as chairman of Great Ormond Street Hospital children's charity, the Tick Tock Club, from 2009 to 2012, as a member of Liverpool University Development Foundation from 2010 to 2014 and vice-chairman of the London Business School's capital campaign from 2014 to 2016. He was a board member of the Lincoln Center in New York City from 2005 to 2008.
