= SolvV =

The legal landscape around SolvV showing its role for risk management of financial institutions in Germany.

SolvV is short for Solvabilitätsverordnung which means solvability directive in German. The long name in German is Verordnung über die angemessene Eigenmittelausstattung von Instituten, Institutsgruppen und Finanzholding-Gruppen, literally "directive on the appropriate setting of equity for (financial) institutes, groups of institutes and financial holding groups".

It translates European banking rules (such as Basel II and Basel III) into German law, ensuring that financial institutions hold enough equity capital to cover risks like defaults, market price shifts, and operational errors. Enacted in late 2006, it largely replaced older banking principles (Grundsatz I). It was restructured in 2014 to eliminate overlap with Capital Requirements Regulation 2013.

It enacted the delegated legislation of §§ 10 ff of the Kreditwesengesetz.

== See also ==
- MaRisk, minimum requirements for risk management in Germany

== External resources ==
- (Unofficial) text of the law (in German)
- Definition of solvency regulation by Deutsche Bundesbank
