= Kreditwesengesetz =

German business law

The legal landscape around the Kreditwesengesetz setting the stage for risk management of financial institutions in Germany.

The German Banking Act Kreditwesengesetz (KWG), literally meaning law of the banking system, is the primary legally implementation of Basel I, Basel II, and Basel III. It is binding for banks and other institutes providing financial services (German: de:Kreditinstitute und de:Finanzdienstleistungsinstitute) in Germany and effective since January 1935, but updated in 1962.

== Purpose ==
The main goals of the KWG are:

- To guarantee and safeguard the functionality of banks (literally in German: Sicherung und Erhaltung der Funktionsfähigkeit der Kreditwirtschaft)
- To safeguard the creditors from losing their invested capital, i.e. any kind of share (literally in German: Schutz der Gläubiger von Kreditinstituten vor Verlust ihrer Einlagen)

The Kreditwesengesetz imposes restriction on risk-related business activities and extends the duty of disclosure. It ensures competences of regulators and is the legal justification of the German Solvability Directive (SolvV) and MaRisk, the corresponding regulation with more detailed definitions and requirements.

== See also ==
- Sarbanes–Oxley Act on similar topics legally binding within the US

== References (in German) ==
- Carl-Theodor Samm, Axel Kokemoor (Hrsg.) u. a.: Gesetz über das Kreditwesen (KWG). Kommentar mit Materialien und ergänzenden Vorschriften. Loseblattwerk, 168. Auflage, C.F. Müller Verlag, Heidelberg, August 2013, ISBN 978-3-8114-5670-9.
- Günther Luz u. a. (Hrsg.): Kreditwesengesetz. Kommentar zum KWG inklusive SolvV, LiqV, GroMiKV, MaRisk. 2. Auflage, Schäffer-Poeschl Verlag, Stuttgart 2011, ISBN 978-3-7910-2934-4.
- Friedrich Reischauer, Joachim Kleinhändler (Begr.) u. a.: Kreditwesengesetz (KWG). Kommentar für die Praxis nebst CRR, Nebenbestimmungen und Mindestanforderungen. Loseblattwerk, Erich Schmidt Verlag, Berlin 2015, ISBN 978-3-503-00060-9.

== External resources ==
- First version of the law from December 1934 (in German)
- Semi-official current text of the law (in German)
- Synopse recent changes of the KWG (in German)
