= Mark Branson =

Director of the Swiss Financial Market Supervisory Authority (born 1968)

Mark Branson (born 9 December 1968, Colchester, United Kingdom) is a British-Swiss financial market expert and former bank manager. He has been President of the German Federal Financial Supervisory Authority since 1 August 2021 and was Director of the Swiss Financial Market Supervisory Authority (FINMA) from 2014 to 2021.

== Life ==
=== Education ===
Branson studied Mathematics and Management Studies (M.A.) at Trinity College, University of Cambridge, from 1986 to 1990, and also obtained a master's degree in Operational Research (M.Sc.) at Lancaster University.

=== Bank Manager ===
Initially, Branson worked for the major Swiss bank Credit Suisse, among other things in a management position in London. Between 1997 and 2009 he held various positions with UBS, another major Swiss bank, including Union Bank of Switzerland (UBS) head of communications from 2001 to 2005. From 2006 to 2008, he held the position of CEO of UBS Securities Japan Ltd. and was country head in Japan. Most recently, he has been CFO of UBS's Wealth Management and Swiss Bank business division in Zurich, responsible for finance and risk control.

=== Swiss Financial Market Supervisory Authority ===
Branson joined the Swiss Financial Market Supervisory Authority (FINMA) on 1 January 2010 as Head of the Banking Division and Member of the executive board. As Head of the Banking Division, he was responsible for the licensing and supervision of all Swiss banks and securities dealers. He was appointed deputy director of FINMA on 1 February 2013. He took office as Director of FINMA on 1 April 2014. He succeeded former Director Patrick Raaflaub, who left FINMA unexpectedly. Branson's appointment as director of the Swiss financial supervisory authority was criticized as he had been the head of UBS in Japan at the time of the manipulation of the Japanese reference interest rate "TIBOR". There he was responsible for investment banking, the securities business as well as asset management and wealth management. As a result of the manipulation and the "Libor scandal" respectively, UBS Bank was to pay fines of EUR 2.5 billion and EUR 1.2 billion. The European Commission waived the EUR 2.5 billion fine because UBS helped to clarify the manipulation. As director of FINMA, Branson was chairman of the national committee for financial crises and a member of the advisory board "Future Financial Centre". On 1 November 2017, he also became Chair of the Resolution Steering Group (ReSG) of the Financial Stability Board (FSB) and thus a member of its Steering Committee. He also represented Switzerland as a member of the Group of Central Bank Governors and Heads of Supervision (GHOS). He left FINMA at the end of May 2021.

=== Federal Financial Supervisory Authority ===
German Finance Minister Olaf Scholz (SPD) announced on 22 March 2021 that Branson would succeed Felix Hufeld, former President of the Federal Financial Supervisory Authority (BaFin), by 1 August 2021 at the latest. Branson took office on 1 August 2021. He is a member of the Financial Stability Committee (AFS) and continues to chair the Resolution Steering Group (ReSG) of the Financial Stability Board (FSB).
