= Informationsdienst Wissenschaft =

Informationsdienst Wissenschaft e.V. or idw (The Science Information Service) operates an Internet platform, which bundles the press reports and dates of important events from about 1,000 scientific institutions, including universities, technical colleges, governmental and non-governmental research institutes and institutes to support research or scientific administration. idw (a registered charitable society) also operates an expert broker, the idw expert finder, which is exclusively for journalists. This makes idw one of the most comprehensive sources of science news in the German-speaking area. Foreign journalists and institutions (mostly European) use idw as well.

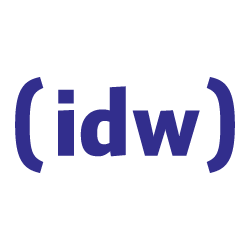
Informationsdienst Wissenschaft e.v.

The two main objectives of idw are:

- To provide the public with a comprehensive picture of science in the German-speaking area.
- To create a close network between the linked (research) institutions.

== Services ==
The information in idw can be accessed free of charge - either directly on idw’s www pages, or by using an individually configurable RSS feed or as an e-mail subscriber. Any user can request the information covering the topics and regions which interest him. All idw services can be used free of cost - the current news ticker, the news app, the science calendar, research in the archive (which contains more than 480,000 press releases), and the list of institutions linked to idw. idw also provides journalists with instruments for contacting experts, and maintains a database with science photos. The members' press offices have various possibilities of communicating with journalists. Membership is only offered to German or foreign institutions which perform research or teaching, or which support science or are active in science in some other way.

In November 2022, idw opened a Mastodon instance, wisskomm.social, named after science communication (Wissenschaftskommunikation).

== Idea and Foundation ==
The original idea of idw was to provide experts for journalists. Using the American ProfNet as example, the press officers of University of Bayreuth, Ruhr University Bochum and Clausthal University of Technology (TUC), in collaboration with the Computing Centre of TUC, developed a concept for a German language network, by means of the new media. The concept was technically implemented by the staff of the Computing Centre of the Clausthal University of Technology. A total of eleven staff members in Bayreuth, Bochum and Clausthal are responsible for software development of the idw user interface, user support and content editorial.

== Financial Support and Development ==
The initial phase (1996–1999) was guaranteed by project support from the Federal Ministry for Education and Research. The technical development of the idw was supported by the Ministry, together with the Stifterverband für die Deutsche Wissenschaft. idw has been working for years with other science communications organisations such as the initiative Wissenschaft im Dialog (Science in Dialogue). idw has been economically independent since 2000 and is financed by contributions from member institutions. It has been organised as a registered charitable society (gemeinnütziger e. V.) since 2002. As part of its quality control, since 2009 idw awards the annual idw Award for Science Communication for the best year's best press releases.

== Significance and Scope ==
idw has developed as a recognised and accepted source for German language science and for science journalism. It has become an instrument for public relations work for scientific institutions. More than 45,000 subscribers (figure for June 2025) receive regular reports from idw, including 9,800 journalists. More than 1,000 institutions publish their press reports and dates of important events via idw.
