= KonTraG =

Business law in Germany

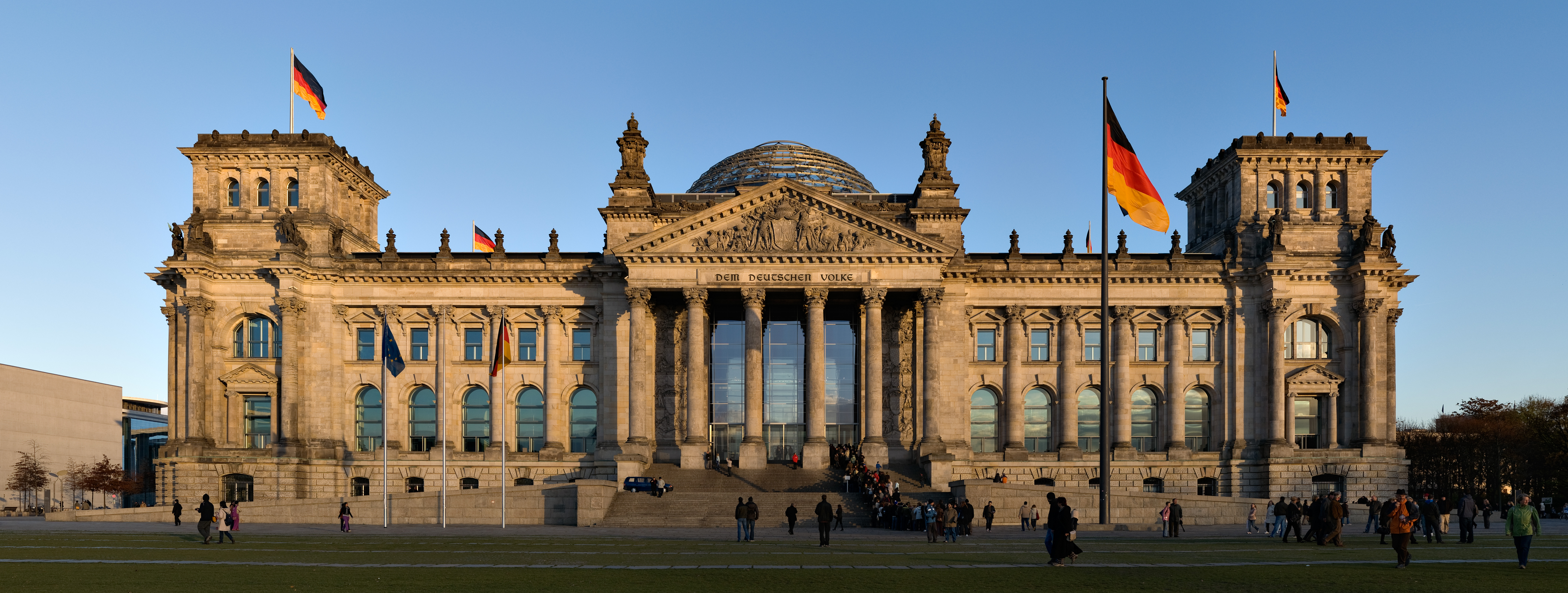

German Bundestag
- Long title: Act on Control and Transparency in Business
- Territorial extent: Germany
- Passed by: German Bundestag
- Passed: 5 March 1998
- Assented to: 5 March 1998
- Commenced: 1 May 1998

Related legislation
- German Commercial Code; Stock Corporation Act
- Status: In force

The Law on Control and Transparency in Business (German: Gesetz zur Kontrolle und Transparenz im Unternehmensbereich) (abbr. KonTraG) is a comprehensive law passed by the German Bundestag on 5 March 1998. It entered into force on 1 May 1998, although some provisions were adopted at later dates. It set new standards of corporate governance for German publicly listed companies. It is similar to the U.S. Sarbanes-Oxley Act of 2002.

== Aims and content ==
The aim of the KonTraG is to improve corporate governance in German companies. Several provisions of commercial and company law have been amended by this Act. The KonTraG specifies and expands mainly the provisions of the German Commercial Code and the Stock Corporation Act. KonTraG has extended the liability of the management boards, supervisory boards and auditors in companies. The core of the KonTraG is a regulation that forces corporate management to implement and operate a company-wide early risk identification system, as well as to publish statements on risks and the company's risk structure in the management report of the company financial statements.

Section 91(2) of the Law stipulates that the executive board is required to "take appropriate measures, in particular to set up a monitoring system so that developments that jeopardize the continued existence of the company are quickly recognized." Such "existence-threatening developments" usually result from the combined effects of individual risks, which obliges companies to carry out regular risk analysis and risk aggregation. Auditors are also required to review compliance with the new requirements by listed companies, in particular with regard to the existence and operation of a risk management system and the related internal audit activities, and to make them part of the audit report. The basis is the IDW test standard 340 (IDW PS 340).

Additionally, the law requires the supervisory board to appoint the auditors, to receive the audit reports, and to include the auditors in the board's balance sheet meeting. All members of the supervisory board or the audit committee must be provided with the audit reports.

KonTraG does not exclusively concern public limited companies, but also covers the limited partnership on shares (KGaA) and many limited liability companies (GmbH), in particular if there is a codetermined or optional supervisory board. In contrast, the so-called small AG's are largely exempted from compliance with the KonTraG provisions.

The establishment and operation of a company-wide risk management system - such as Management Risk Controlling (MRC) - are critically scrutinized and examined by the banks per Basel II. For companies that work on the basis of projects (construction companies, large architectural firms, IT system houses), risk management is therefore also part of the project management tasks.

Furthermore, for the first time, the granting of subscription rights to employees and members of the management board from a contingent capital increase pursuant to Section 192 AktG was placed on a legal footing.
