= Industry in Brazil =

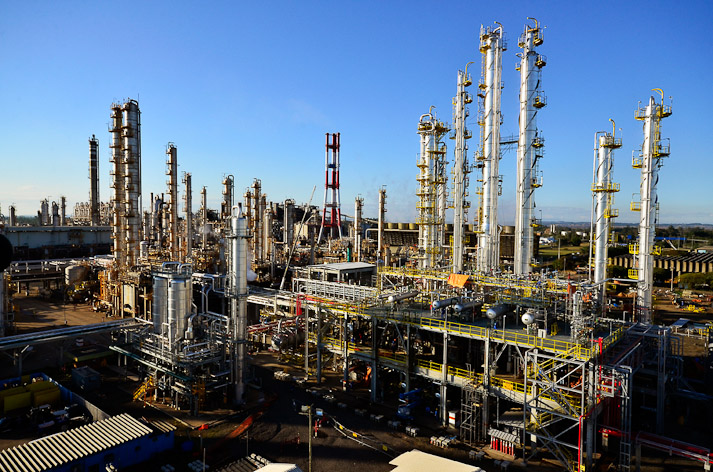
Braskem industrial plant

Brazilian industry has its earliest origin in workshops dating from the beginning of the 19th century. Most of the country's industrial establishments appeared in the Brazilian southeast (mainly in the provinces of Rio de Janeiro, Minas Gerais and, later, São Paulo), and, according to the Commerce, Agriculture, Factories and Navigation Joint, 77 establishments registered between 1808 and 1840 were classified as "factories" or "manufacturers". However, most, about 56 establishments, would be considered workshops by today's standards, directed toward the production of soap and tallow candles, snuff, spinning and weaving, foods, melting of iron and metals, wool and silk, amongst others. They used both slaves and free laborers.

There were twenty establishments that could be considered in fact manufacturers, and of this total, thirteen were created between the years 1831 and 1840. All were, however, of small size and resembled large workshops more than proper factories. Still, the manufactured goods were quite diverse: hats, combs, farriery and sawmills, spinning and weaving, soap and candles, glasses, carpets, oil, etc. Probably because of the instability of the regency period, only nine of these establishments were still functioning in 1841, but these nine were large and could be considered to "presage a new era for manufactures".

The advent of manufacturing before the 1840s was extremely limited, due to the self-sufficiency of the rural regions, where farms producing coffee and sugar cane also produced their own food, clothes, equipment, etc., the lack of capital, and high costs of production that made it impossible for Brazilian manufacturers to compete with foreign products. Costs were high because most raw materials were imported, even though some of the plants already used machines.

From a colony whose aim was to export primary goods (sugar, gold and cotton), Brazil has managed to create a diversified industrial base in the 20th century. The steel industry is a prime example of that, with Brazil being the 9th largest producer of steel in 2018, and the 5th largest steel net exporter in 2018. Gerdau is the largest producer of long steel in the Americas, owning 337 industrial and commercial units and more than 45,000 employees across 14 countries. Brazil is also a key player in the aircraft market: Embraer is the third largest producer of civil aircraft right after Boeing and Airbus.

== 1840s–1860s ==
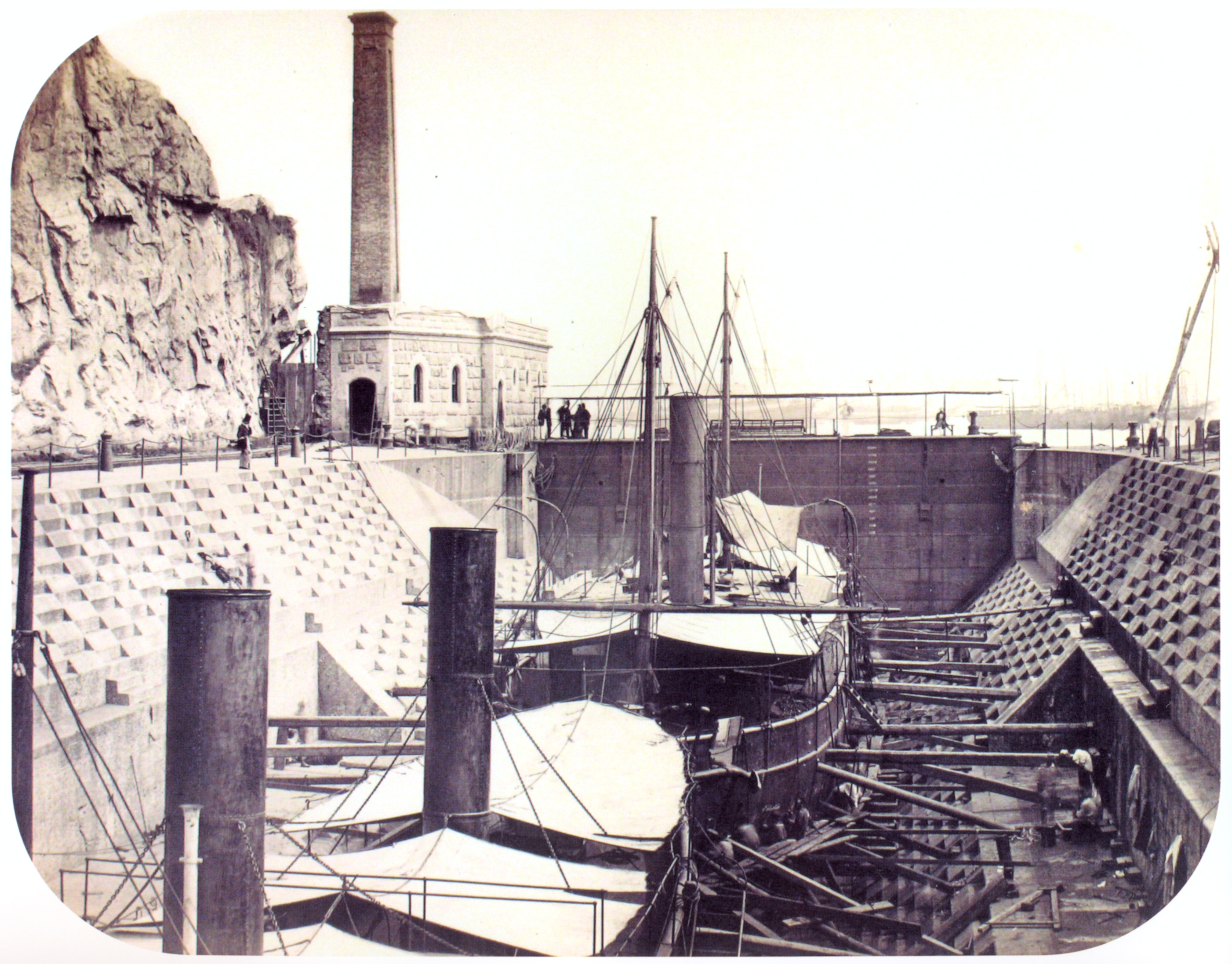
Shipyard in the city of Rio de Janeiro, c.1862.

The promulgation of the Alves Branco Tariff modified this picture. This tariff succeeded in increasing state revenues and stimulating the growth of national industry. The sudden proliferation of capital was directed to investments in urban services, transports, commerce, banks, industries, etc. Most of the capital invested in industry was directed toward textiles. With unprecedented industrial growth, multiple manufacturing establishments appeared, dedicated to such diverse products as smelting of iron and metal, machinery, soap and candles, glasses, beer, vinegar, gallons of gold and silver, shoes, hats and cotton fabric.

One of the main establishments created at this period was the metallurgical factory Ponta da Areia (in English: Sand Tip), in the city of Niterói, that also constructed steamships. It is likely that the textile industry benefited most by the virtue of being the oldest in the country. It first appeared in 1826, in the city of Recife, capital of the province of Pernambuco. The textile sector was quite dynamic in the monarchic period and received large investments until 1890, when it entered into decline. Various modernizations occurred, principally between 1840 and 1860, when factories with a high level of technological capability were created, able to compete with other major international centers. Other improvements came with the establishment of factories and forges geared for the production of equipment and pieces for textile manufacture. And now Brazil ranks second in the world's largest producer of denim, the third – for the production of knitted fabrics, the fifth – for the manufacture of clothing and seventh – for the production of yarns and fibers. The concentration of industry that emerged in the province of Bahia considerably expanded its economic scope, reaching the south of Ceará, Piauí and even Minas Gerais.

The extinction of the traffic in African slaves in 1850, contrary to what many authors allege, did not "liberate" credit for industrial development. That claim has no documentary basis whatever. On the contrary, capital employed in the trade had already been directed to sectors such as enterprises of urban services, transport, banking and trade. But it is possible that there was an indirect contribution to the growth of the industrial sector through banking loans. In 1850, there were 50 factories with a capital of at least Rs 7.000:000$000.

The imperial government created several incentives for the industrialization of the country. The earliest of these date from the reign of Dom Pedro I, through awards of government grants. The first establishment to receive such a grant was the Fábrica das Chitas (in English: Chitas Factory), devoted to paper and printing, by a decree of 26 June 1826. The practice was resumed in the 1840s, when new industrial establishments received subsidies. in 1857, seven factories benefited from this practice of incentives, among them, the Ponta da Areia mentioned above and that was owned by Irineu Evangelista de Sousa (later Viscount of Mauá). One of the criteria for the granting of these subsidies was the exclusive employment of free workers.

The goal, then, was not only the transition from the old colonial economic system to that of the modern capitalist, but also from slave labor to free. Other incentives arose, such as the decree of 8 August 1846 that exempted manufactured products from certain transport taxes (internally as well as externally), shielded from military recruitment a specific number of employees of industrial establishments and eliminated tariffs on parts and machinery imported for textile factories. The following year in June, a new decree stated that all industrial establishments on national soil would be free of taxes on imported raw materials. Thus, production costs of domestic industry dropped considerably, allowing it to compete with foreign products. The Alves Branco tariff underwent modification in 1857, reducing to 15% the tax on imported products. Later, under the Rio Branco cabinet at the beginning of the 1870s, the tariff on foreign products was newly raised to 40%, and new raw materials were exempted from import taxes.

== 1860s–1880s ==
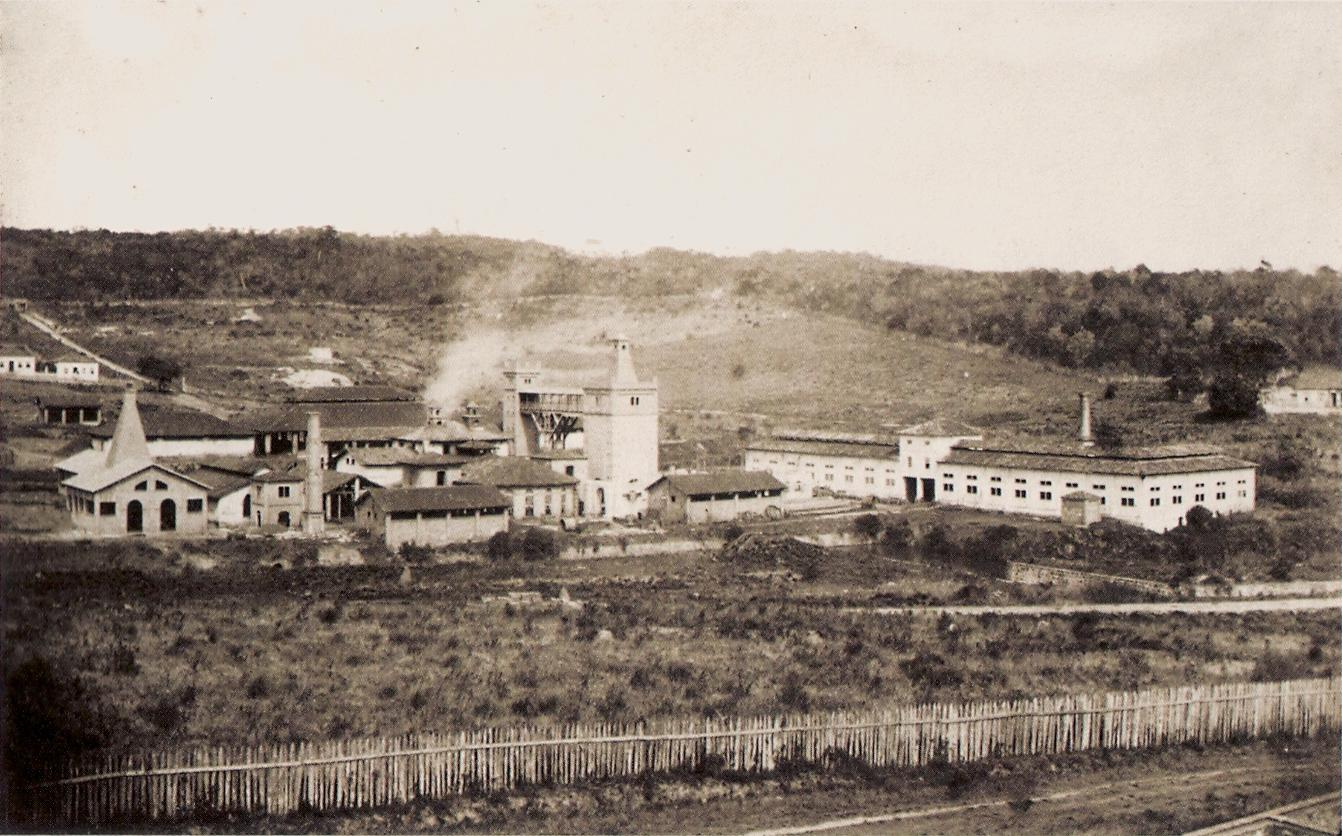
Iron Factory in Sorocaba, province of São Paulo, 1884.

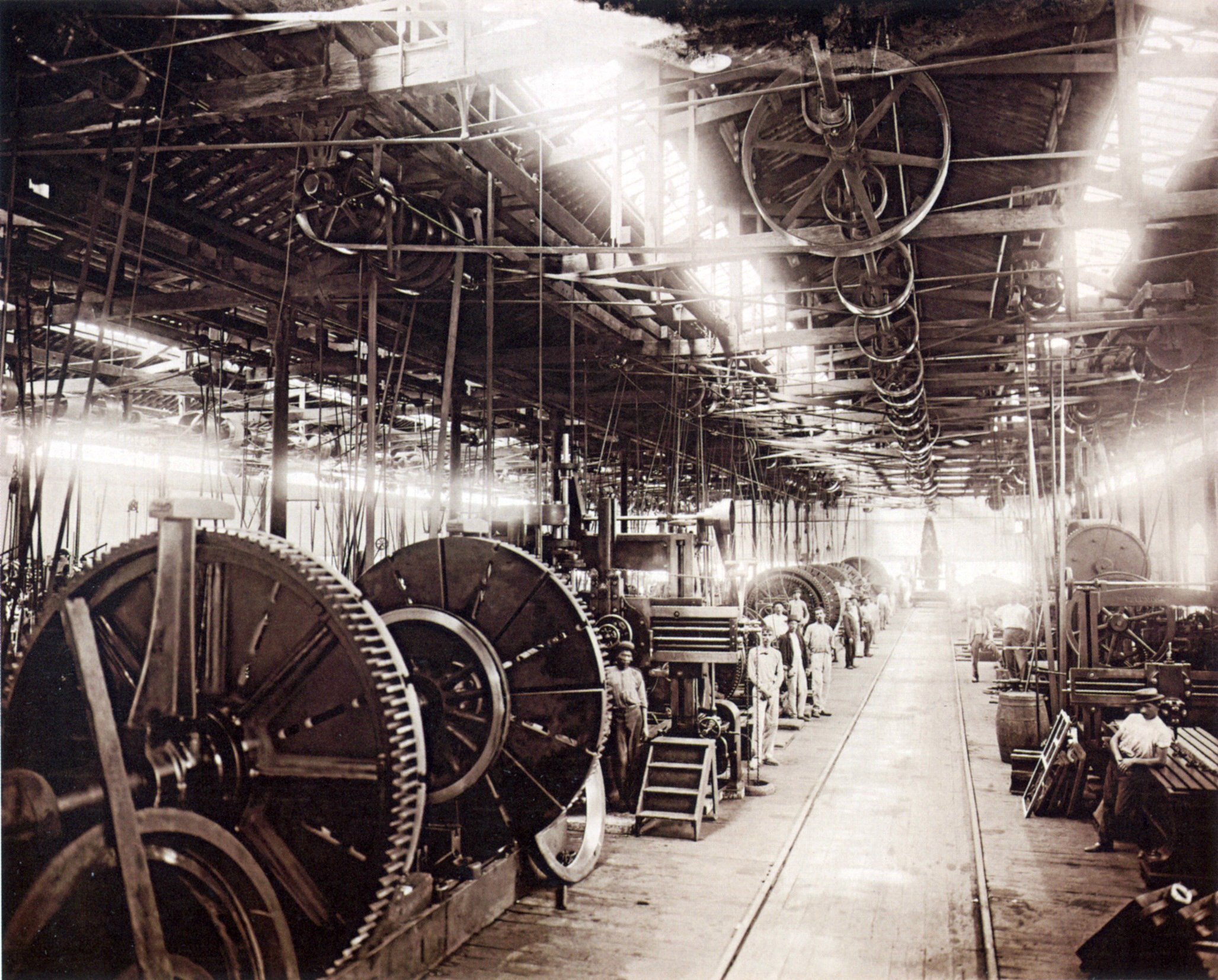
Factory in Brazil, 1880.

At the end of the 1860s, came a new industrial surge caused by two armed conflicts: the American Civil War and the Paraguayan War. U.S. production of cotton was interrupted by the blockade by Union forces of the Confederacy. The second resulted in the emission of currency and an increase in import tariffs to cover the costs of war. This resulted in a great stimulus not only for the textile industry, but also for other sectors, such as chemicals, cigars, glass, paper, leather, and optical and nautical instruments.

During the 1870s, the decline of the coffee region of the Paraíba Valley and in some areas of sugar production, caused many plantation owners to invest not only in the cotton textile industry, but also in other manufacturing sectors. Deployment of a railway network throughout the national territory also stimulated the emergence of new industrial activities, mainly in São Paulo. Industry experienced a major impetus in this period. From the 1870s onward, the great expansion of industrialization became a constant in Brazil. In 1866, there were nine textile factories with 795 workers. In 1881, there were 46 textile factories through the country: 12 in Bahia; 11 in Rio de Janeiro; nine in São Paulo; nine in Minas Gerais; and five in other provinces. The number of establishments diminished a little by 1885 to 42 textile factories with 3,172 workers. However, the drop did not impede overall growth in the sector up to 1889.

In 1880 the Industrial Association was established, with its first board elected the following year. It supported new industrial incentives and propagandized against the defenders of an essentially agricultural Brazil. 9.6% of the capital of the Brazilian economy was directed to industry by 1884, and by 1885, 11.2%. This figure dropped sharply during the republican period, falling to 5% between 1895 and 1899, and improved slightly to 6% between 1900 and 1904. Still, it took many years to return to the level that prevailed during the Empire. At the time of its downfall in 1889, monarchical Brazil had 636 factories (representing an annual rate of increase of 6.74% from 1850) with a capital of Rs 401.630:600$000 (annual growth rate of 10.94% since 1850). Of this amount, 60% were employed in the textile sector, 15% in food, 10% in the chemical, 4% in timber, 3.5% in clothing and 3% in metallurgy.

== Brazilian industrial sector ==
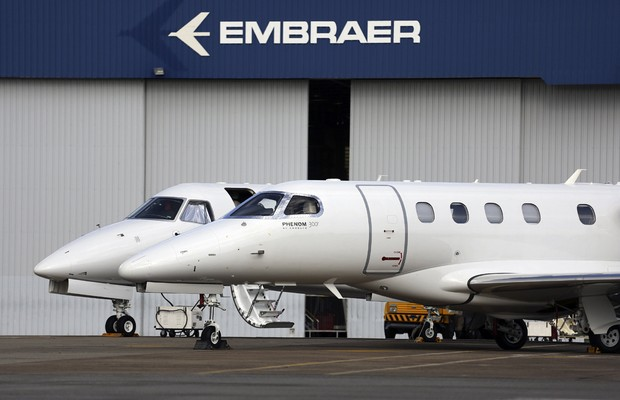
Embraer's headquarters in São José dos Campos.

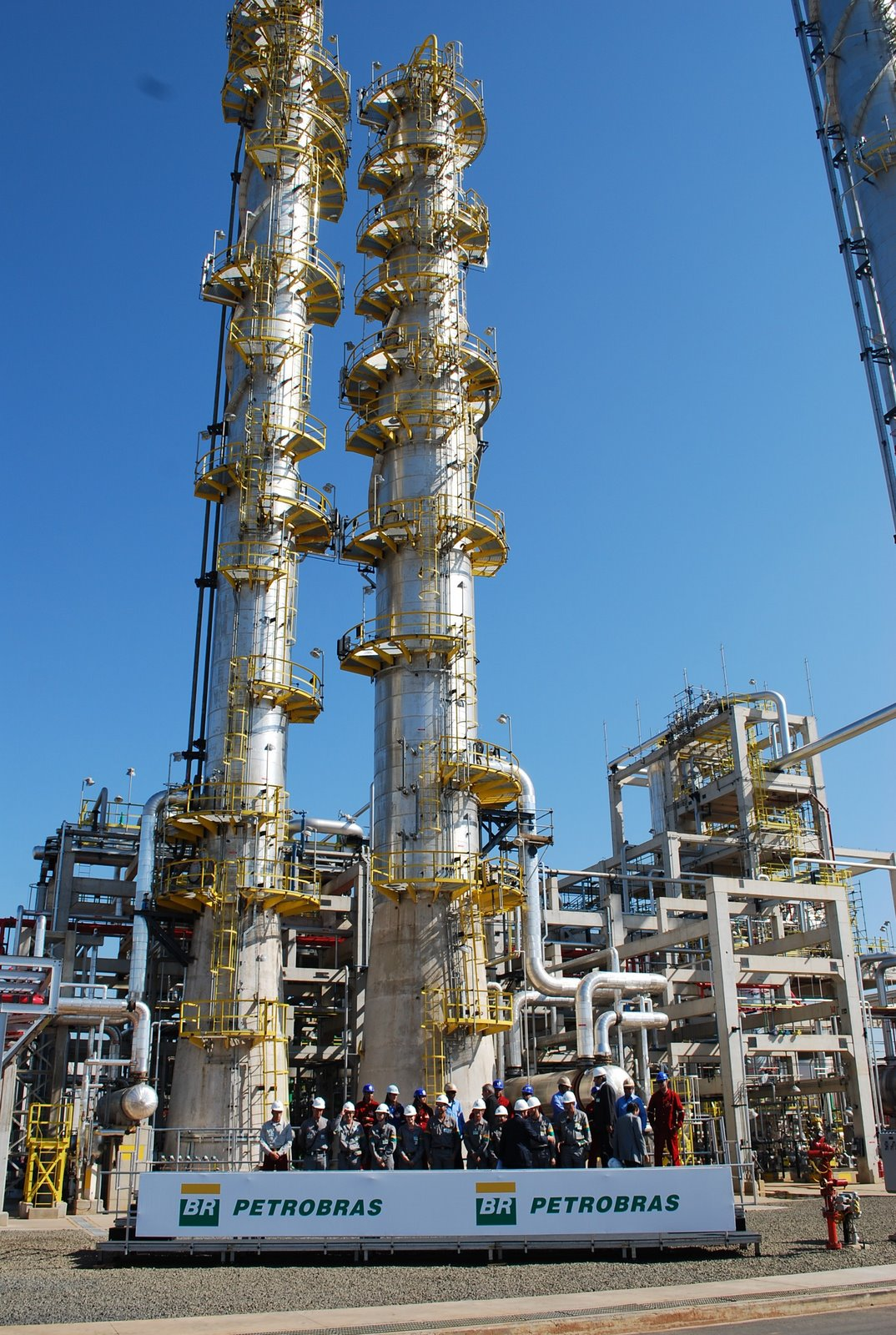
REPLAN, the largest oil refinery in Brazil, in Paulínia.

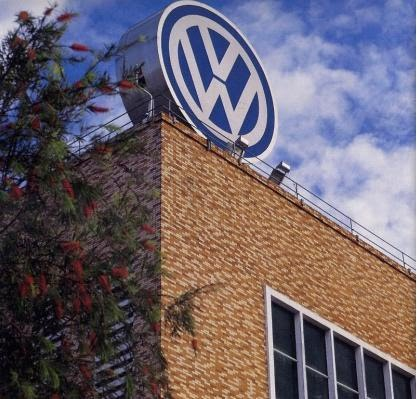
Volkswagen factory in São Bernardo do Campo.

=== Overview ===
In Brazil, most large industries are concentrated in the south and southeast regions of Brazil. Historically, the northeast has been the poorest part of the country, but it is now starting to attract new investments.

Brazil has the third best advanced industrial sector in The Americas. Accounting for one-third of GDP, Brazil's diverse industries range from automobiles, steel and petrochemicals to computers, aircraft, and consumer durables. With the increased economic stability provided by the Plano Real, Brazilian and multinational businesses have invested heavily in new equipment and technology, a large proportion of which has been purchased from U.S. firms.

In 2019, Brazil's secondary (industrial) sector accounted for only 11% of the country's economic activity. In the 1990s, this sector represented more than 15% of the GDP. By 1970, its participation was at 21.4%. The Brazilian industry has experienced one of the most significant declines globally over the past 50 years. The deindustrialization of the Brazilian economy is particularly notable and occurred early on. It is common for the industry to lose ground as families' per capita income increases, leading to a shift towards consuming more services and fewer goods. However, in Brazil, a high per capita income was not achieved, and the country did not become wealthy enough for the productive structure to transition rapidly. As a result, the country is at a standstill. The sector's stagnation partly accounts for the slow recovery of the labor market in the country. Experts suggest that the solution to this issue would involve implementing more financing mechanisms, addressing bottlenecks in national infrastructure and the tax system to revitalize the industry and enhance Brazil's competitiveness. Brazil ranks as the ninth-largest industrial park in the world.

=== Geographical variation ===
In 2017, the Southeast was responsible for 58% of the value of industrial transformation in Brazil, followed by the South (19.6%), Northeast (9.9%), North (6.9%) and Midwest (5.6%).

=== Automotive sector ===
In Brazil, the automotive sector represents close to 22% of industrial GDP. The ABC Region in São Paulo is the first center and largest automobile hub in Brazil. When manufacturing in Brazil was predominantly concentrated in the ABC Region, the state accounted for 74.8% of Brazilian production in 1990. By 2017, this figure had decreased to 46.6%, and in 2019, it further dropped to 40.1%. This decline was influenced by the internalization of vehicle production in Brazil, driven by factors such as high labor costs and charges imposed by unions, which deterred investments and prompted manufacturers to seek new locations. The development of the ABC cities has also contributed to reducing their attractiveness, as a result of escalating real estate prices and increased residential area density. The area around Porto Real, in Rio de Janeiro was already the second largest pole in 2017, but in 2019 it fell to 4th place, behind Paraná (15%) and Minas Gerais (10.7%). In the Southeast, São Paulo has plants from GM, Volkswagen, Ford, Honda, Toyota, Hyundai, Mercedes-Benz, Scania, and Caoa. Rio de Janeiro has Nissan, Land Rover, Citroen/Peugeot, and MAN plants. Minas Gerais has Fiat and Iveco factories. In the South, Paraná has Volkswagen, Renault, Audi, Volvo, and DAF factories; Santa Catarina has GM and BMW plants and Rio Grande do Sul, a GM plant. In the Midwest, Goiás has Mitsubishi, Suzuki, and Hyundai factories. In the Northeast, Bahia has a Ford factory and Pernambuco has a Jeep factory. Despite being the eighth largest vehicle producer in the world in 2018, Brazil didn't have a national industry. The last Brazilian industry was Gurgel.

In 2017, the main manufacturers of tractors in Brazil were John Deere, New Holland, Massey Ferguson, Valtra, Case IH and the Brazilian Agrale. All have factories in the Southeast, basically in São Paulo.

=== Mineral extraction ===
The mineral extractive industry represents 15% of the GDP of Rio de Janeiro. In the state, this sector corresponds almost entirely to the exploration and production of oil and gas, which reflects its importance for the economy of Rio de Janeiro. The transformation industry represents 6% of the State's GDP. In 2019, Rio de Janeiro was the largest producer of oil and natural gas in Brazil, with 71% of the total volume produced. São Paulo comes in 2nd place, with an 11.5% share of total production. Espírito Santo was the third largest producer state, with 9.4%.

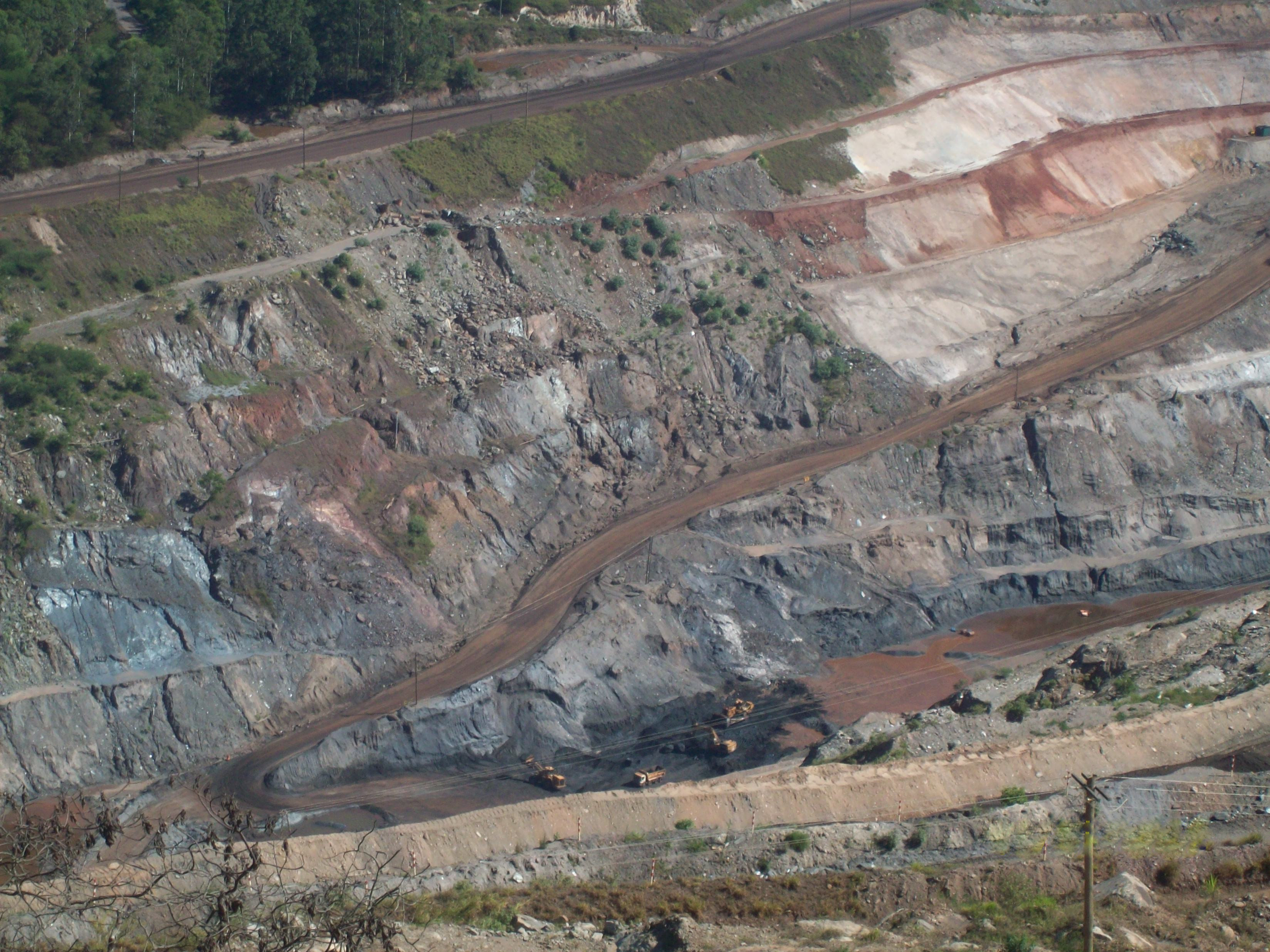
Vale iron mine in Itabira.

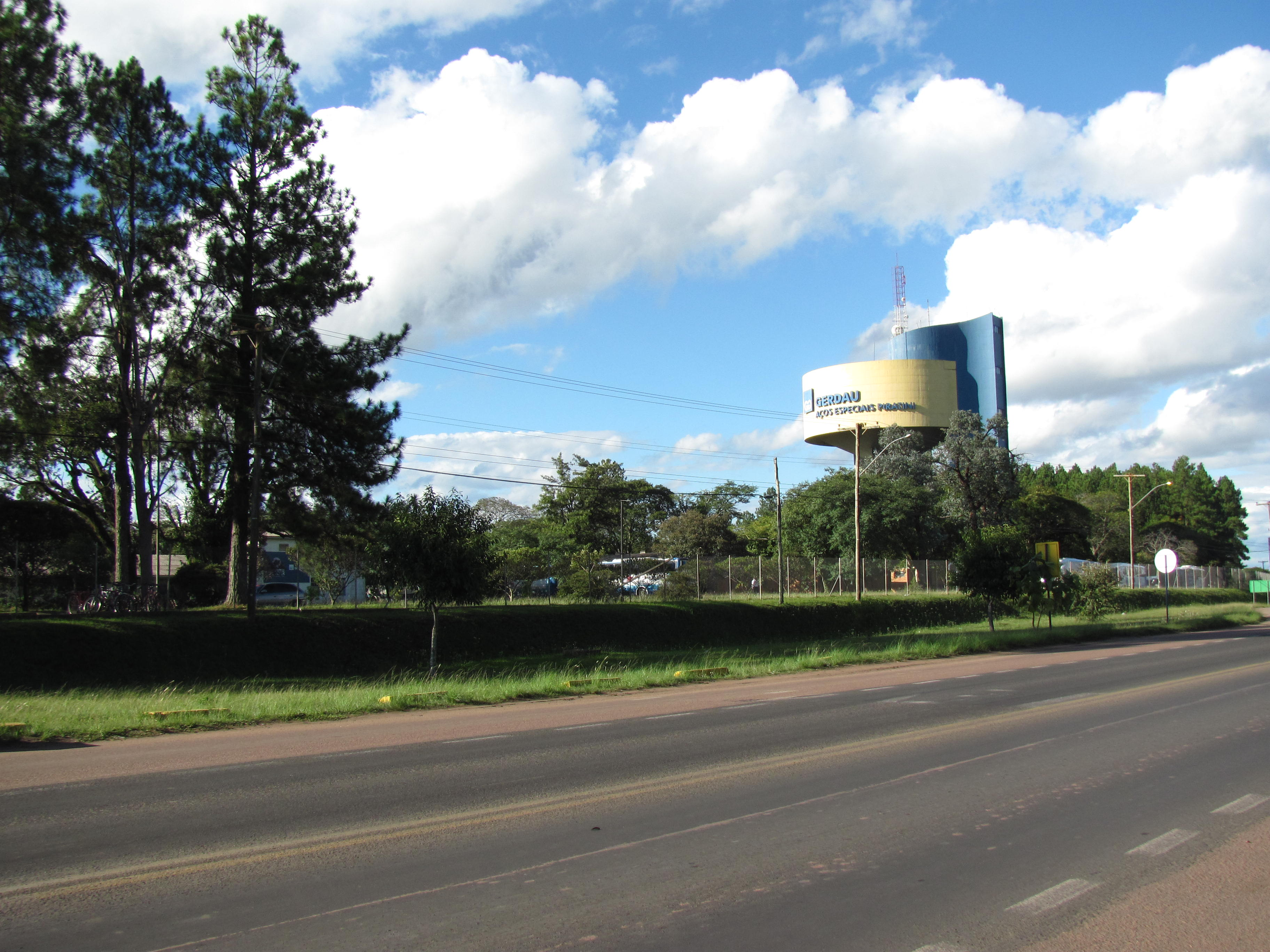
Gerdau plant in Charqueadas.

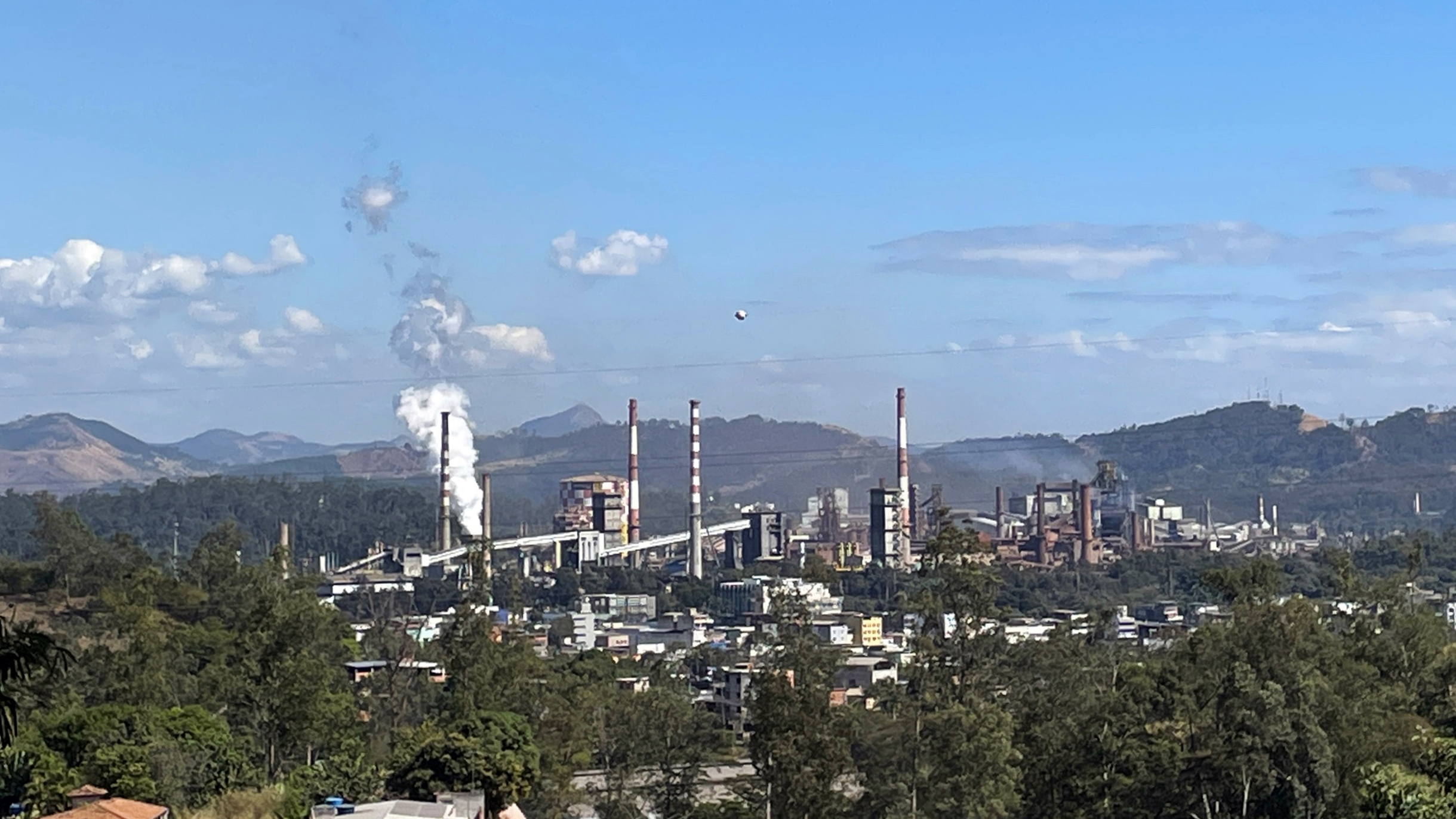
Usiminas in Ipatinga.

In 2016, substances in the metallic class accounted for about 77% of the total value of Brazilian commercialized mineral production. Among these substances, eight correspond to 98.6% of the value: aluminum, copper, tin, iron, manganese, niobium, nickel and gold. Highlight for the significant participation of iron in this amount, whose production is mainly concentrated in the states of Minas Gerais and Pará.

According to the National Department of Mineral Production (DNPM), in 2011 there were 8,870 mining companies in the country, with the Southeast region accounting for 3,609 of them, about 40% of the total. In the Southeast region, iron ore, gold, manganese, and bauxite, in the Quadrilátero Ferrífero; niobium and phosphate in Araxá; gemstones in Governador Valadares; and graphite, in Salto da Divisa, all located in the state of Minas Gerais. Additionally, there are aggregates in São Paulo and Rio de Janeiro, and ornamental rocks in Espírito Santo.

The income of the mining sector in Brazil was R$153.4 billion in 2019, with exports totaling U$32.5 billion. The country's iron ore production reached 410 million tons in 2019. Brazil is the second-largest global iron ore exporter and holds the second position in the reserve ranking, with at least 29 billion tons beneath Brazilian soil. The largest reserves are currently located in the states of Minas Gerais and Pará. According to data from 2013, Minas Gerais is the largest mining state in Brazil. With mining activity in more than 250 municipalities, and more than 300 mines in operation, the state has 40 of the 100 largest mines in Brazil.

In addition, of the 10 largest mining municipalities, seven are in Minas, with Itabira being the largest in the country. It is also responsible for approximately 53% of the Brazilian production of metallic minerals and 29% of the total minerals, in addition to extracting over 160 million tons/year of iron ore. Vale S.A. is the main company active in the production of iron ore in the state. The state is the largest employer in the mineral activity (53,791 workers in 2011). São Paulo, the second largest employer, had 19 thousand employees in the sector this year.

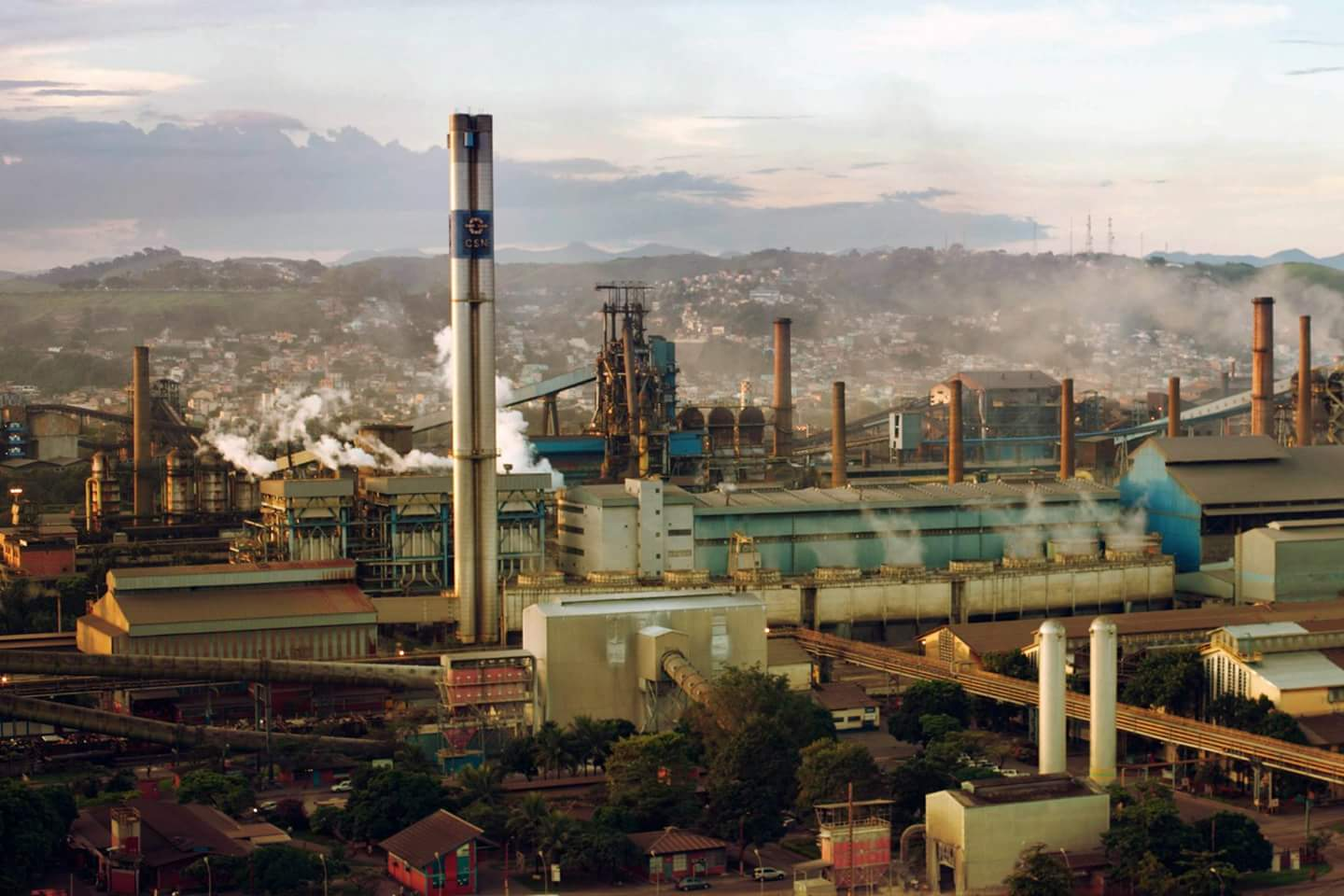
CSN, at Volta Redonda.

In steel industry, Brazilian crude steel production was 32.2 million tons in 2019. Minas Gerais accounted for 32.3% of the volume produced in the period, with 10.408 million tons. The other largest steel centers in Brazil in 2019 were: Rio de Janeiro (8.531 million tons), Espírito Santo (6.478 million tons) and São Paulo (2.272 million tons). National production of rolled products was 22.2 million tons, and that of semi-finished products for sales totaled 8.8 million tons. Exports reached 12.8 million tons, or US$7.3 billion. Among the largest steel companies in the Southeast are Gerdau, CSN, Ternium Brasil, Usiminas and Aperam South America.

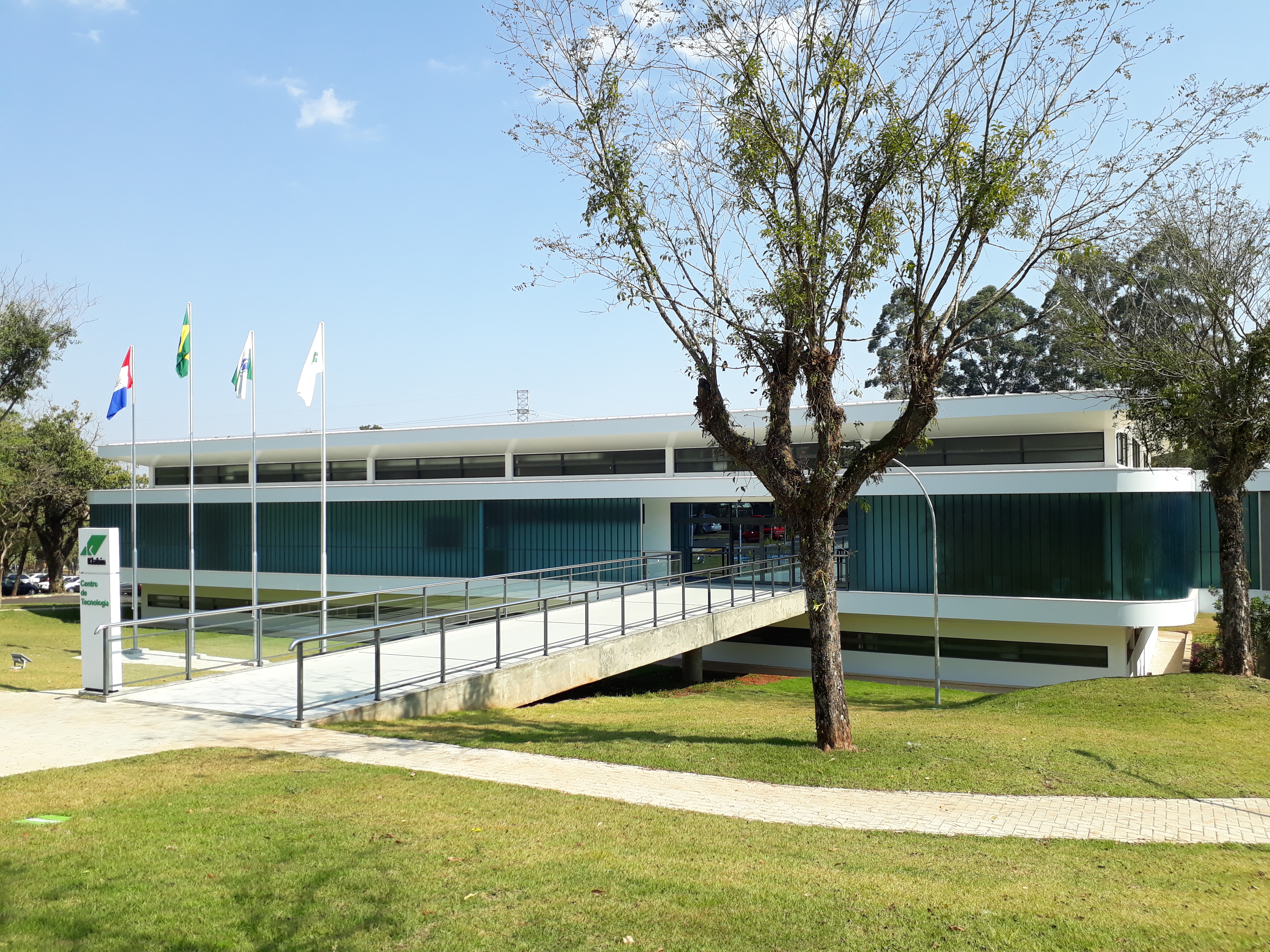
Klabin Technology complex in Telêmaco Borba.

=== Paper and cellulose ===
In the paper and cellulose sector, Brazilian pulp production was 19.691 million tons in 2019. The country exported US$7.48 billion in pulp this year, with US$3.25 billion going to China. Brazilian forest-based industry exports totaled US$9.7 billion (US$7.48 billion in cellulose, US$2 billion in paper, and US$265 million in wood panels). Paper production reached 10.535 million tons in 2019, with the country exporting 2.163 million tons. In 2016, the paper and cellulose industry in the South of the country represented 33% of the national total. That year, Paraná led the nation in the production of roundwood (mainly eucalyptus) for the pulp and paper industry, with 15.9 million m^{3}. Brazil was the second-largest producer of cellulose globally and the eighth in paper production. The city that most produced these woods in Brazil was Telêmaco Borba (PR), and the 5th largest was Ortigueira (PR).

Espírito Santo stands out in this sector. n 2018, US$920 million worth of cellulose was traded in the foreign market, making it the third strongest Espírito Santo product in the export balance. In 2016, the top five states producing logs for paper and cellulose (mainly eucalyptus) were Paraná (15.9 million m^{3}), São Paulo (14.7 million m^{3}), Bahia (13.6 million m^{3}), Mato Grosso do Sul (9.9 million m^{3}), and Minas Gerais (7.8 million m^{3}). Together, they accounted for 72.7% of the national production of 85.1 million m^{3}. Espírito Santo, in ninth place, had a production of 4.1 million m^{3}. São Mateus, in the North of Espírito Santo, was the best-placed city in the Southeast, ranking as the sixth largest producer of roundwood for paper and cellulose in the country. The ten largest producing municipalities accounted for 22.9% of the country's production, including Telêmaco Borba (PR), Três Lagoas (MS), Caravelas (BA), Mucuri (BA), Ortigueira (PR), São Mateus (ES), Dom Eliseu (PR), Nova Viçosa (BA), Water Clara (MS), and Ribas do Rio Pardo (MS).

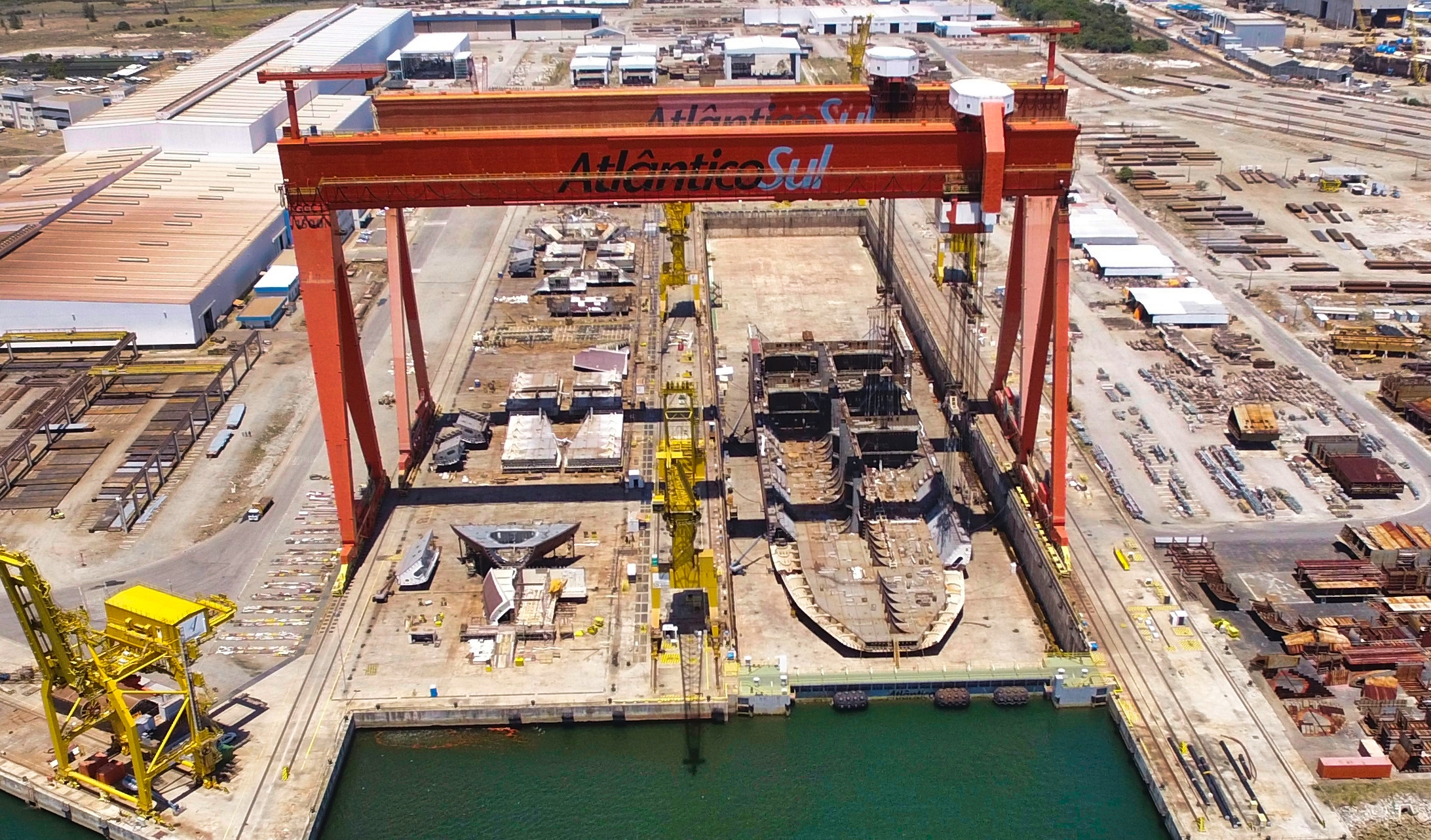
Estaleiro Atlântico Sul in Pernambuco.

=== Shipbuilding ===
The shipbuilding sector of Rio de Janeiro is one of the most important in the country, but it has already had two major historical crises: one in the 1980s, when it went bankrupt, and another that started in 2014, both due to the country's economic situation: between 2014 and 2016, the Brazilian shipbuilding industry lost 49% of its employed people. The drop of about 30 thousand vacancies was concentrated in the state of Rio de Janeiro, which closed around 23 thousand jobs in the same period. From 31.2 thousand employed in 2014, the number dropped to just 8 thousand in 2016. The gross real value of industrial production also fell 71%, from R $6.8 billion in 2014, to R $1.97 billion in 2016. However, at the end of 2019, the return of the pre-salt began to re-boost the naval sector: maintenance and repair activities pointed to increased demand for the coming years.

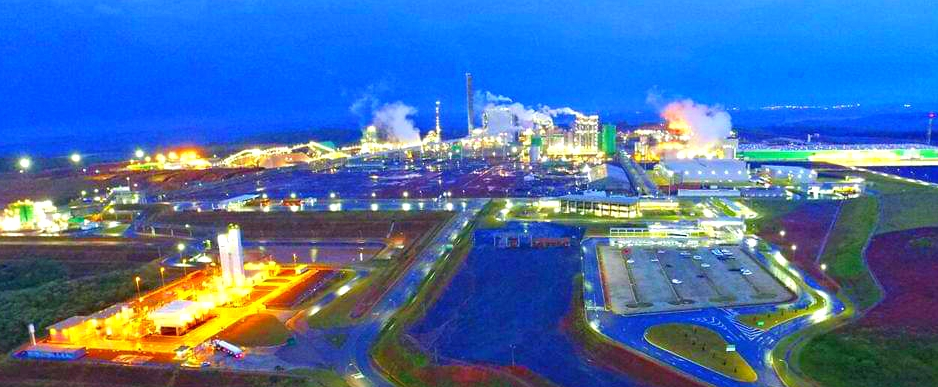
Industrial facilities in Ortigueira, Paraná

=== Chemical industry ===
In 2011, Brazil had the 6th largest chemical industry in the world, with net sales of US$157 billion, or 3.1% of world sales. At that time, there were 973 factories for chemical products for industrial use. They are concentrated in the Southeast Region, mainly in São Paulo. The chemical industry contributed 2.7% to Brazilian GDP in 2012 and established itself as the fourth largest sector in the manufacturing industry. Despite registering one of the largest sales in the sector in the world, the Brazilian chemical industry, in 2012 and 2013, saw a strong transfer of production abroad, with a drop in national industrial production and an increase in imports. One third of consumption in the country was served by imports. 448 products stopped being manufactured in Brazil between 1990 and 2012. This resulted in the stoppage of 1,710 production lines. In 1990, the share of imported products in Brazilian consumption was only 7%, in 2012 it was 30%. The main companies in the sector in Brazil are: Braskem, BASF, Bayer, among others. In 2018, the Brazilian chemical sector was the eighth largest in the world, accounting for 10% of the national industrial GDP and 2.5% of the total GDP. In 2020, imports will occupy 43% of the domestic demand for chemicals. Since 2008, the average use of capacity in the Brazilian chemical industry has been at a level considered low, ranging between 70 and 83%.

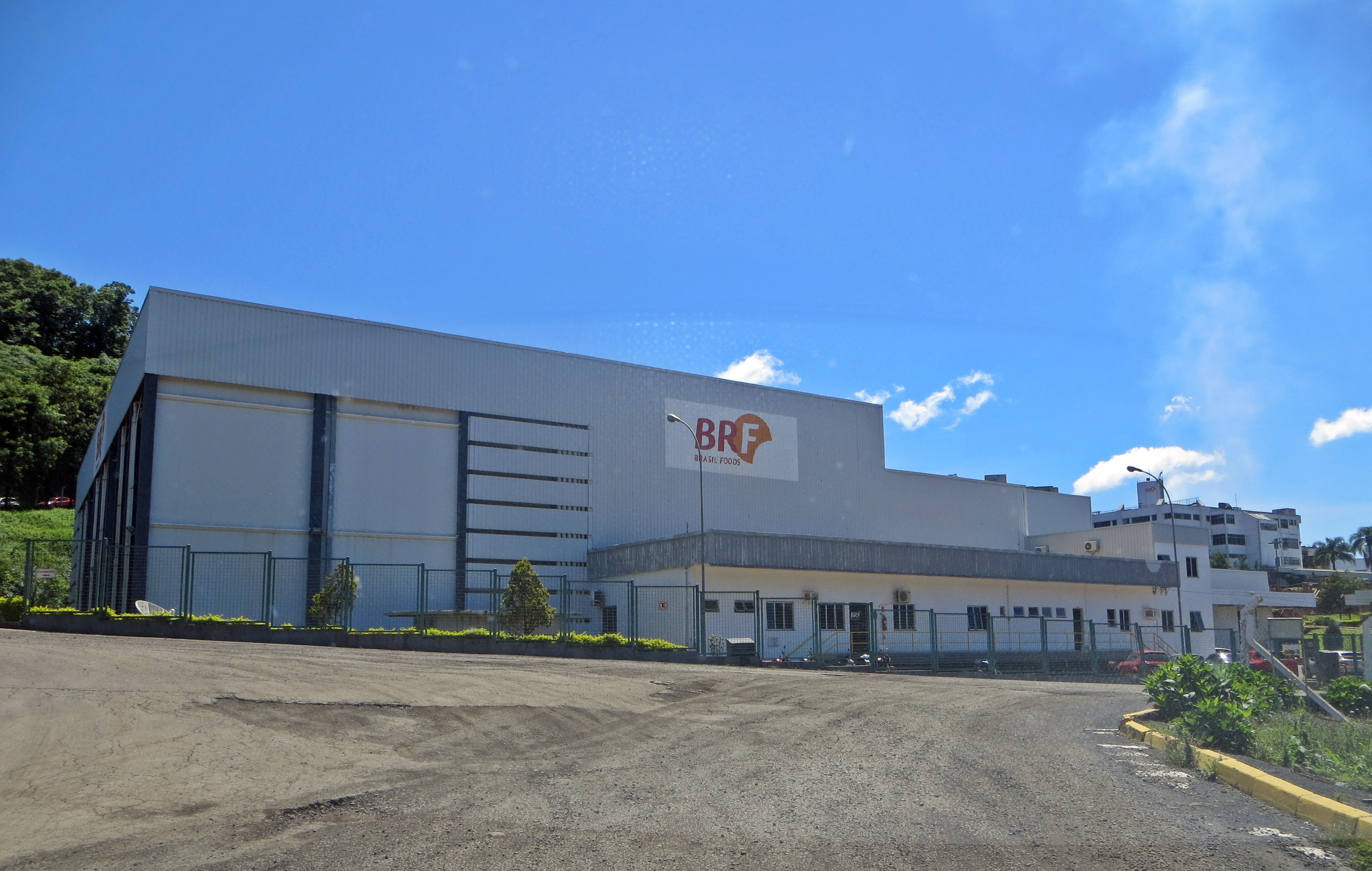
Perdigão Agroindustrial Headquarters, in Videira.

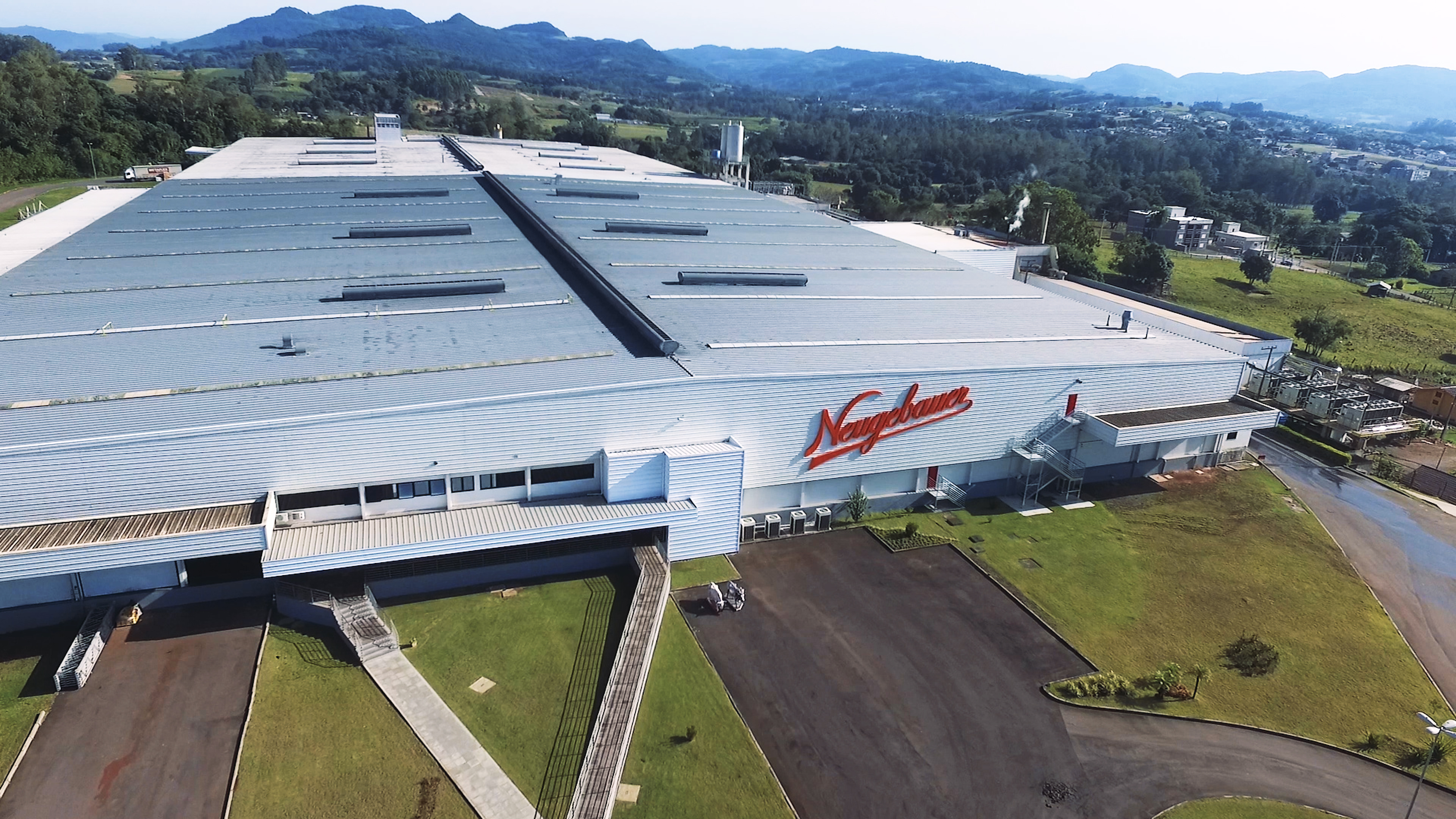
Neugebauer SA's headquarters in Arroio do Meio.

=== Food industry ===
In Food industry, In 2019, Brazil was the 2nd largest exporter of processed foods in the world, with a value of U $34.1 billion in exports. The Brazilian food and beverage industry's revenue in 2019 was R $699.9 billion, 9.7% of the country's Gross Domestic Product. In 2015, the industrial food and beverage sector in Brazil comprised 34,800 companies (not counting bakeries), the vast majority of which were small. These companies employed more than 1,600,000 workers, making the food and beverage industry the largest employer in the manufacturing industry. There are around 570 large companies in Brazil, which concentrate a good part of the total industry revenue. The top 50 were: JBS, Ambev, Bunge, BRF, Cargill, Marfrig, LDC do Brasil, Amaggi, Minerva Foods, Coca Cola Femsa, Aurora, Vigor, M.Dias Branco, Camil Alimentos, Solar.Br, Granol, Caramuru Alimentos, Bianchini, Copacol, Citrosuco, Trustmill, Três Corações Alimentos S.A., Itambé, Ajinomoto, Algar Agro, Piracanjuba, Vonpar, Agrex, Frimesa, GTFoods Group, Grupo Simões, Elebat Alimentos, Garoto, Pif Paf Alimentos, J. Macêdo, Frigol, Josapar, Olfar Alimento e Energia, Embaré, Alibem, Dalia Alimentos, Asa Participações, Cacique, Frisa, Arroz Brejeiro, Gomes da Costa, Pamplona, Moinhos Cruzeiro do Sul, Better Beef, SSA Alimentos and Correcta.

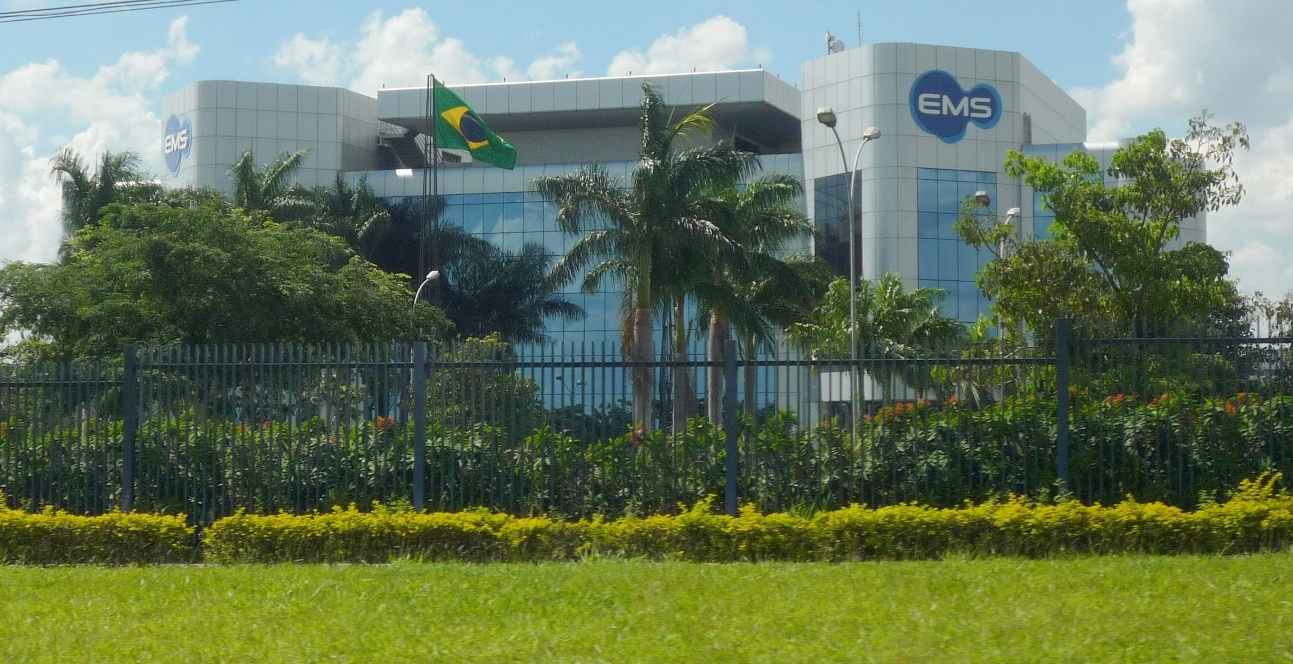
EMS headquarters in Hortolândia.

=== Pharmaceutical industry ===
In pharmaceutical industry, most companies in Brazil have traditionally been based in Rio de Janeiro and São Paulo. However, in 2019, due to the tax advantages offered in states like Pernambuco, Goiás and Minas Gerais, companies started relocating from RJ and SP to these states. During this period, the number of companies associated with Sinfar-RJ decreased from over 110 to just 49. Rio de Janeiro, at that time, was known as the most expensive state for pharmaceutical production, with its ICMS at 20%. Despite this, in 2019, the Rio de Janeiro industrial park had revenues of almost R $8 billion and an 11% share in the Brazilian pharmaceutical market. Several pharmaceutical industries are located in the Jacarepaguá neighborhood, such as GSK, Roche, Merck, Servier, and Abbott.

In 2017, Brazil was considered the sixth largest pharmaceutical market in the world. Drug sales in pharmacies reached around R $57 billion (US$17.79 billion) in the country. The pharmaceutical market in Brazil had 241 laboratories regularized and authorized for the sale of medicines. Of these, the majority (60%) have national capital. Multinational companies held about 52.44% of the market, with 34.75% in marketed packaging. Brazilian laboratories represent 47.56% of the market in sales and 65.25% in boxes sold. In the distribution of drug sales by state, São Paulo occupied the first position: the São Paulo drug industry had a turnover of R $53.3 billion, 76.8% of total sales across the country. Just behind came Rio de Janeiro, which had revenues of approximately R $7.8 billion. The pharmaceutical industry's exports reached US$1.247 billion in 2017. The companies that most profited from the sale of medicines in the country in 2015 were EMS, Hypermarcas (NeoQuímica), Sanofi (Medley), Novartis, Aché, Eurofarma, Takeda, Bayer, Pfizer and GSK.

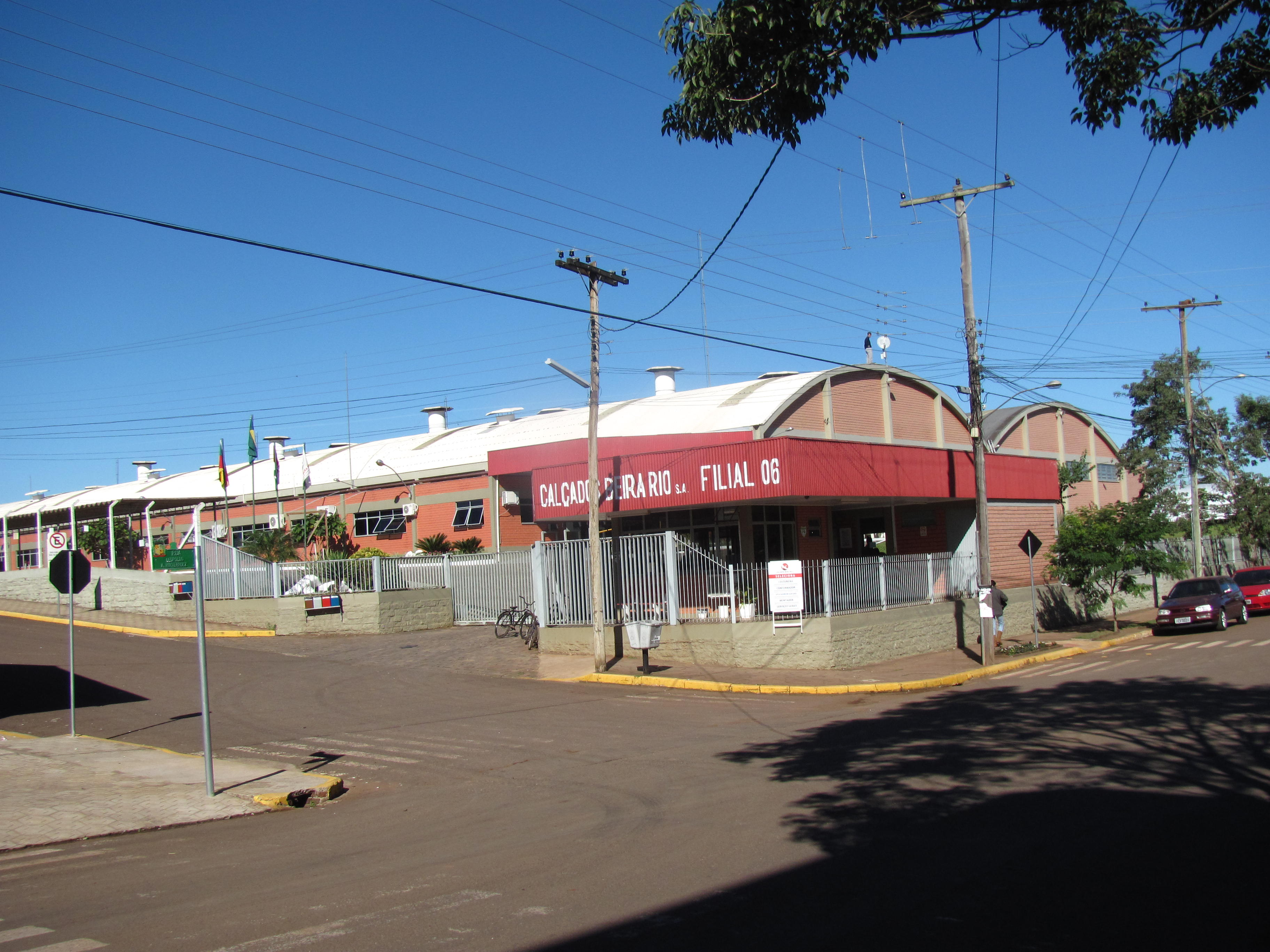
Beira Rio Shoes, in Mato Leitão.

=== Footwear ===
In the leather-footwear sector (Footwear industry), in 2019 Brazil produced 972 million pairs. Exports were around 10%, reaching almost 125 million pairs. Brazil is in the 4th position among the world producers, behind China (who produces more than 10 billion pairs), India and Vietnam, and in 11th place among the biggest exporters. Of the pairs produced, 49% were made of plastic or rubber, 28.8% were made of synthetic laminate and only 17.7% were made of leather. The largest pole in Brazil is located in Rio Grande do Sul (region of Vale dos Sinos, in 25 cities around Novo Hamburgo).

Rio Grande do Sul is the Brazilian state that exports the most footwear products, with exports reaching US$448.35 million in 2019. The majority of the product goes to United States, Argentina and France. Domestic consumption absorbs a large part of production. The state has established some of the most important factories in the sector. São Paulo has important footwear hubs, such as the city of Franca, known for men's shoes, Jaú for women's shoes, and Birigui for children's shoes. Franca, and Birigui collectively represent 92% of footwear production in the State of São Paulo.

Birigui, with 350 companies employing about 13,000 workers, produces 45.9 million pairs per year, with 52% of children's shoes in the country originating from this city. Jaú boasts 150 factories producing around 130,000 pairs of women's shoes daily. The footwear sector in Franca comprises approximately 550 companies and employs around 20,000 workers, with many of the most renowned men's shoe factories in the country originating from São Paulo. Minas Gerais has a hub specialized in affordable shoes and counterfeit sneakers in Nova Serrana, with about 830 industries producing around 110 million pairs in 2017.

Overall, the Brazilian industry faces challenges in competing with Chinese footwear, which offers unbeatable prices due to differences in tax collection and labor taxes. Brazilian entrepreneurs have had to focus on value-added products, emphasizing quality and design to remain competitive. Some of the most famous companies in the country are Beira Rio, Grendene, Ortopé, Piccadilly, Usaflex, Vulcabrás, Alpargatas and Rainha.

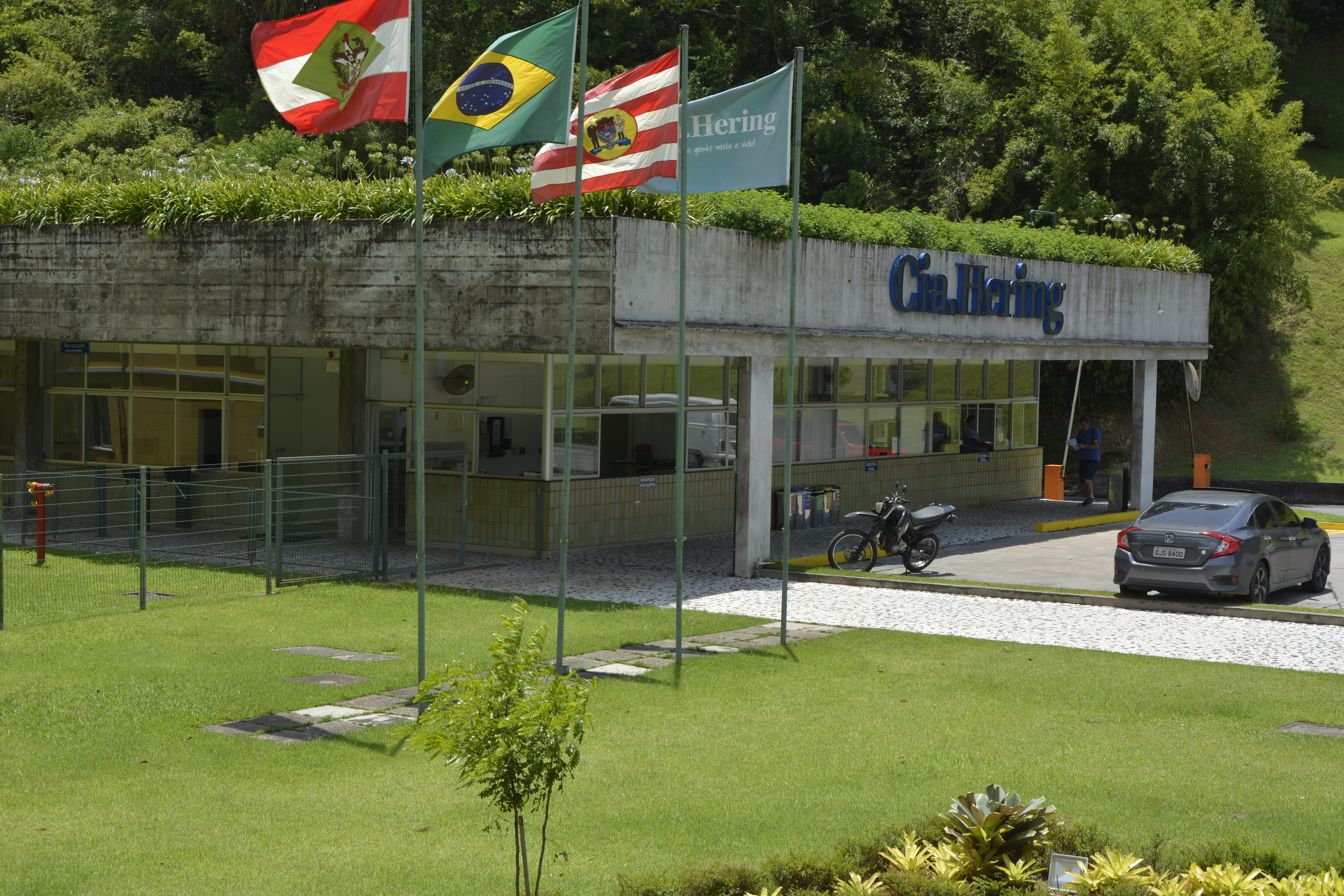
Hering Headquarters, in Blumenau.

=== Textiles ===
In Textile industry, Brazil, despite being among the 5 largest producers in the world in 2013 and having a significant presence in textile and clothing consumption, has limited participation in global trade. In 2015, Brazilian imports ranked 25th globally, totaling US$5.5 billion, while exports placed Brazil at the 40th position. Brazil's share in global textile and clothing trade is only 0.3%, primarily due to challenges in competing on price with producers in India and especially China.

The gross value of production in the Brazilian textile industry, which includes the consumption of intermediate goods and services, amounted to nearly R$40 billion in 2015, representing 1.6% of the gross value of Industrial Production in Brazil. The Southeast region accounts for 48.29% of production, followed by the South with 32.65% and the Northeast with 16.2%. The Midwest (2.5%) and North (0.4%) have a smaller presence in this sector. São Paulo (37.4%) is the largest producer. Minas Gerais has 8.51% (ranking as the 3rd largest producer in the country, after Santa Catarina).

The textile industry employs 260 thousand people in Brazil, with 128 thousand in the Southeast region. Key textile clusters in Brazil include Vale do Itajaí (SC), the Metropolitan Region of São Paulo (SP), and Campinas (SP), collectively accounting for 36% of formal jobs in the industry. In 2015, there were 2,983 textile companies in Brazil. Santa Catarina was the 2nd largest employer in the textile and clothing sector in Brazil that year. It led the nation in pillow manufacturing and is the largest producer of woven labels in Latin America and the second largest globally. Santa Catarina is also the top exporter in Brazil of toilet/kitchen cloths, cotton terry cloth fabrics, and cotton knit shirts. Notable companies in the region include Hering, Malwee, Karsten and Haco.

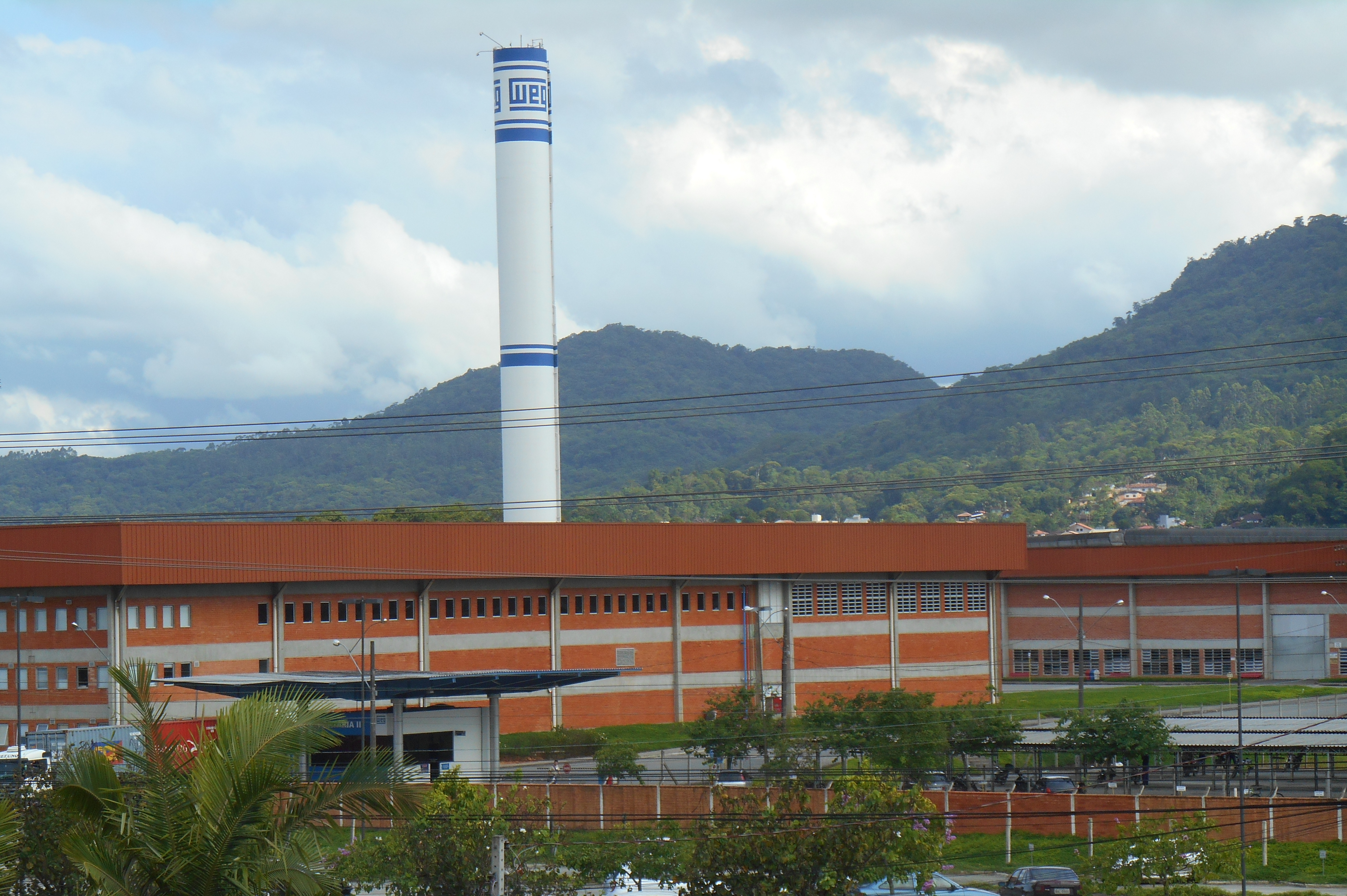
WEG, one of the largest electrical equipment manufacturers in the world, in Jaraguá do Sul.

=== Electronics ===
In Electronics industry, the turnover of industries in Brazil reached R $153.0 billion in 2019, about 3% of the national GDP. The number of employees in the sector was 234.5 thousand people. Exports were US$5.6 billion, and the country's imports were US$32.0 billion. Brazil, despite its efforts over the decades to get rid of the dependence on technology imports, has not yet managed to reach this level. Imports are concentrated in expensive components, such as processors, microcontrollers, memories, under-mounted magnetic disks, lasers, LED and LCD. Cables for telecommunication and electricity distribution, wires, optical fibers and connectors are manufactured in the country. Brazil has two large electro-electronic production hubs, located in the Metropolitan Region of Campinas, in the State of São Paulo, and in Free Economic Zone of Manaus, in the State of Amazonas. There are large internationally renowned technology companies, as well as part of the industries that participate in its supply chain, including companies that applies artificial intelligence in their business. The country also has other smaller centers, such as the municipalities of São José dos Campos and São Carlos, in the State of São Paulo; the municipality of Santa Rita do Sapucaí, in the State of Minas Gerais; Recife, capital of Pernambuco; and Curitiba, capital of Paraná. In Campinas there are industrial units from groups such as General Electric, Samsung, HP and Foxconn, a manufacturer of products from Apple and Dell. São José dos Campos, is focused on the aviation industry. This is where the headquarters of Embraer is located, a Brazilian company that is the third largest aircraft manufacturer in the world, after Boeing and Airbus. In Santa Rita do Sapucaí, 8 thousand jobs are linked to the sector, with more than 120 companies. Most produce equipment for the telecommunications industry, such as converters (set-top Box), including those used in the transmission of the digital TV system. The technological center of Curitiba has companies such as Siemens and Positivo Informatics. In all, 87 companies and 16 thousand employees work at Tecnoparque, an area of 127 thousand square meters created by state law in 2007. Tecnoparque can grow up to 400 thousand square meters and receive up to four times the number of workers it has today, reaching 68 thousand people.

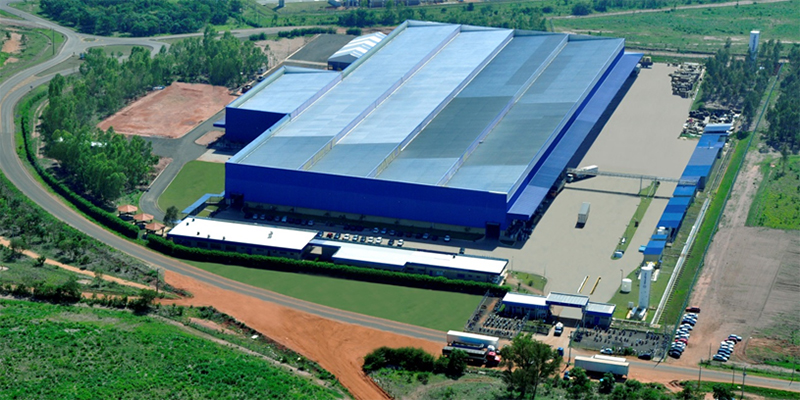
Metalfrio headquarters in Três Lagoas, Brazilian multinational manufacturer of refrigeration equipment.

=== Appliances ===
In the household appliances industry, sales of so-called "white line" equipment (refrigerator, air conditioning and others) were 12.9 million units in 2017. The sector had its peak sales in 2012, with 18.9 million units. The brands that sold the most were Brastemp, Electrolux, Consul and Philips. Brastemp is originally from São Bernardo do Campo-SP. Consul is originally from Santa Catarina, having merged with Brastemp and today being part of the multinational Whirlpool Corporation. Another famous brand from the South was Prosdócimo, founded in Curitiba, which was sold to Electrolux.

In the small appliances sector, Brazil has two famous companies: Arno, which was 70 years in São Paulo, and today its factory is located in Itatiaia-RJ; and Britânia, originally from Curitiba-PR.

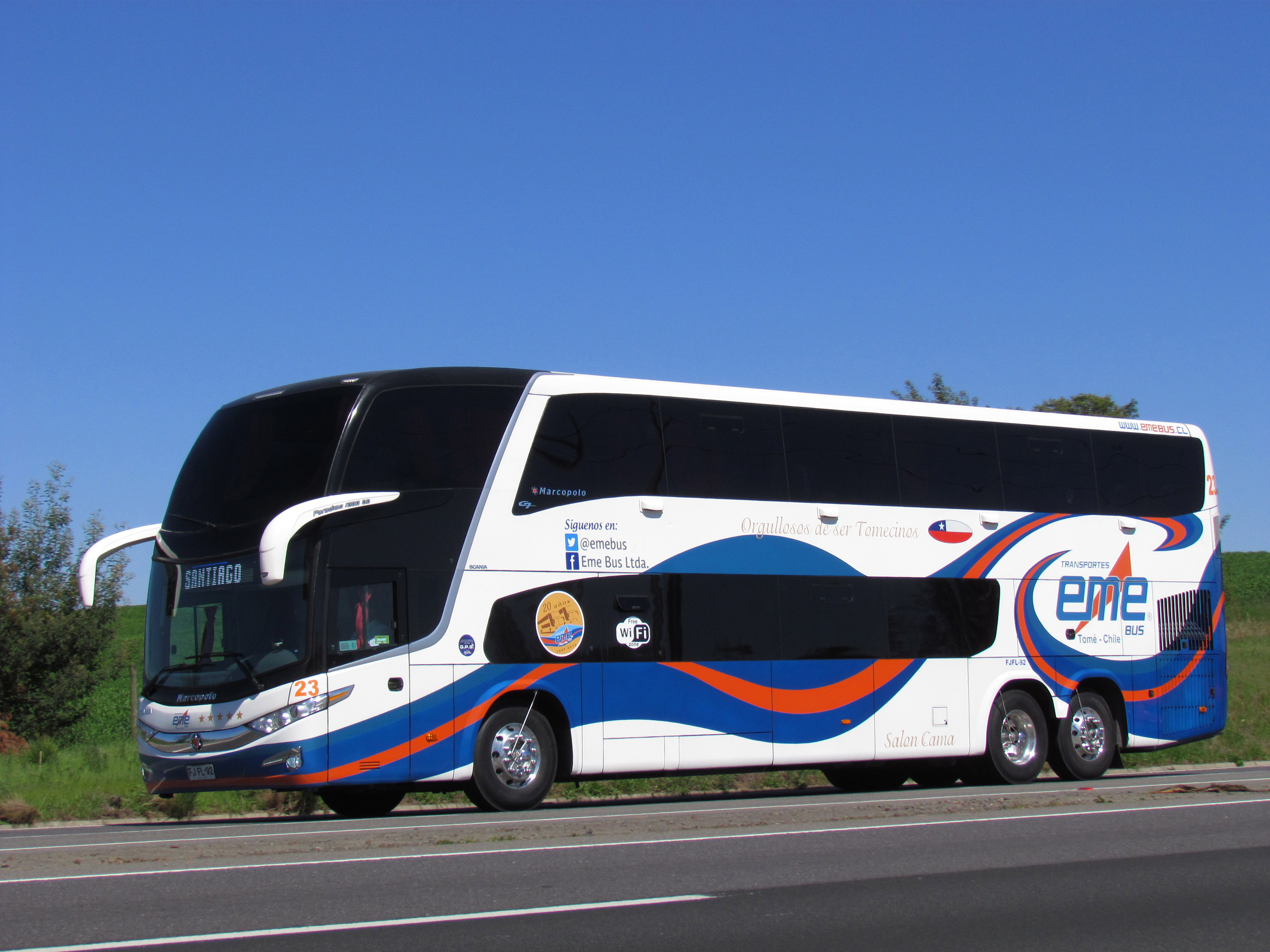
Marcopolo is a global bus and coach manufacturer with headquarters in Caxias do Sul.

=== Metallurgical industry ===
In the metallurgical business, the South has one of the most famous companies in the country, Tramontina, originally from Rio Grande do Sul and famous manufacturer of knives, pans, shovels and various utensils, which has more than 8,500 employees and 10 manufacturing units. Other famous companies in the South are Marcopolo, a manufacturer of bus bodies, which had a market value of R $2.782 billion in 2015, and Randon, a group of 9 companies specialized in solutions for the transportation, which brings together manufacturers of vehicles, auto parts, and road equipment - employs around 11,000 people and recorded gross sales in 2017 of R $4.2 billion.

Another important industry, based in Rio de Janeiro, is White Martins, which deals with the manufacture of industrial and medical gases, such as oxygen cylinders. It is a supplier of all Brazilian petrochemical hubs and one of the largest suppliers to the steel industry. The company also has a strong presence in the metal-mechanic, food, beverage, environment and small consumer segment, in the medical-hospital sector and in the natural gas area.

=== By state and region ===
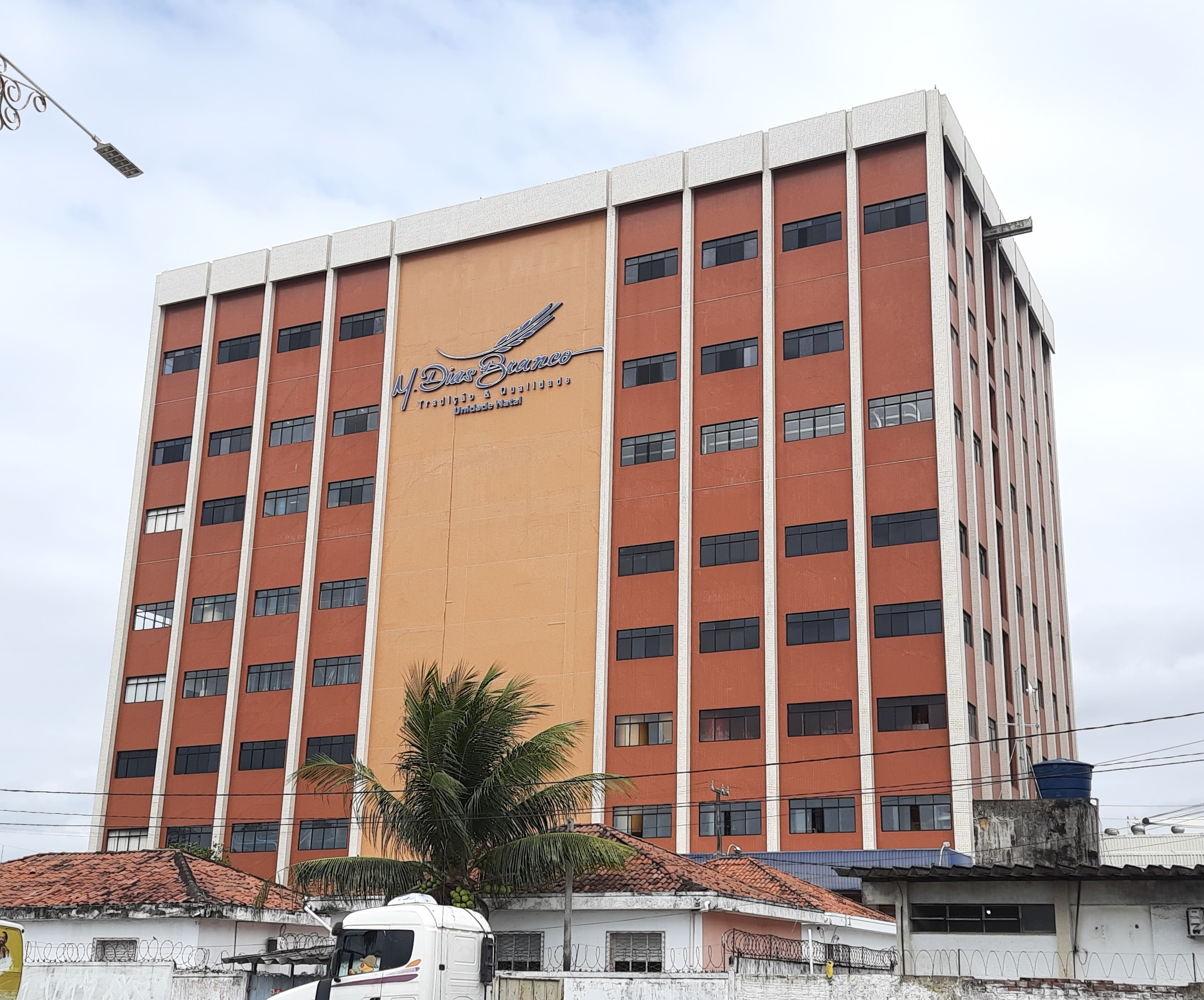
Food industry M. Dias Branco in Natal.

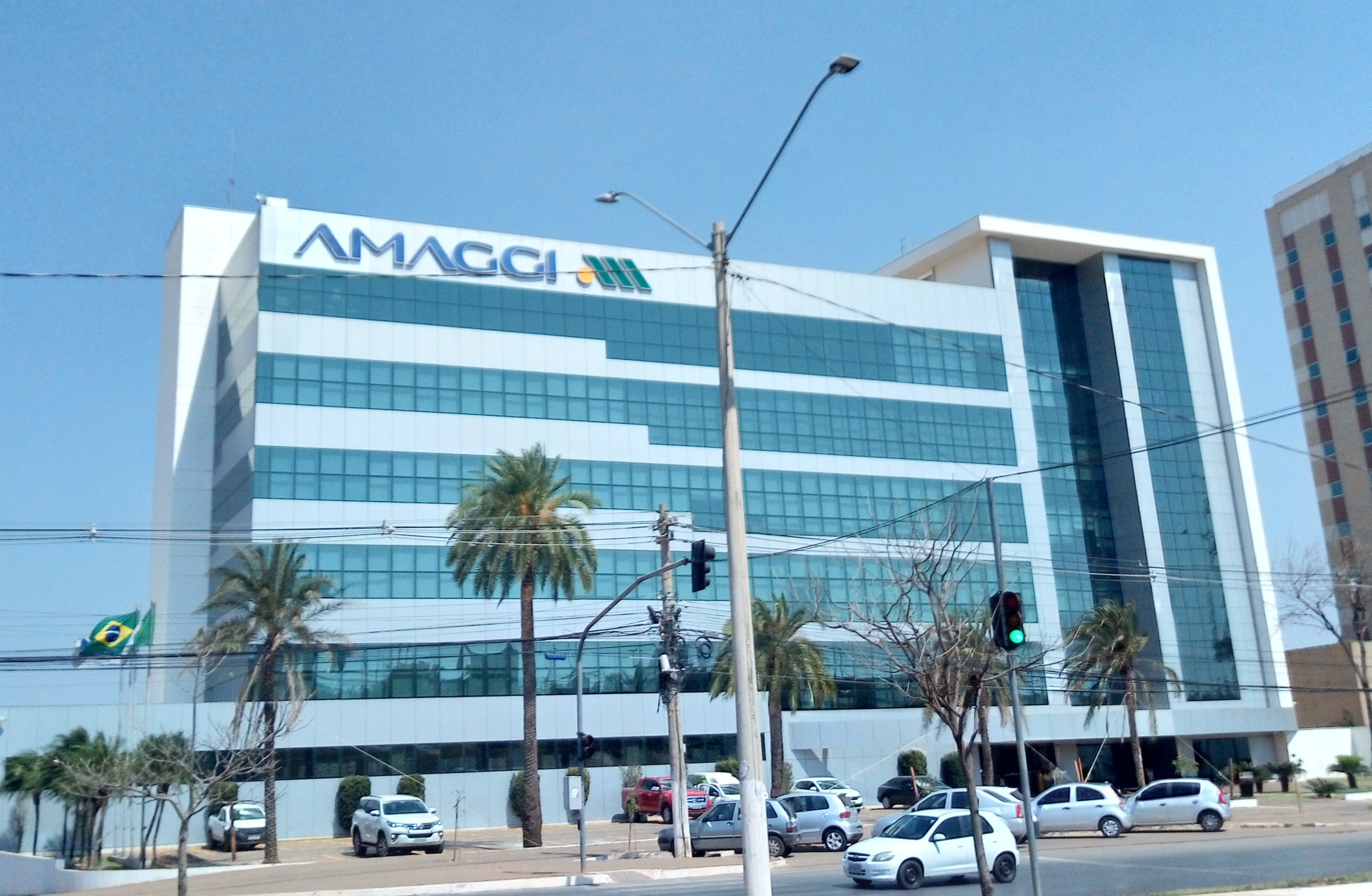
Amaggi Group Headquarters in Cuiabá.

Southeast, South and Midwest are responsible for 80% of the national industrial GDP, as shown below:

São Paulo in 2017 had an industrial GDP of R $378.7 billion, equivalent to 31.6% of the national industry and employing 2,859,258 workers in the industry. The main industrial sectors are: Construction (18.7%), Food (12.7%), Chemicals (8.4%), Public Utility Industrial Services, such as Electricity and Water (7.9%) and Motor Vehicles (7.0%). These 5 sectors concentrate 54.7% of the state's industry.

Minas Gerais had in 2017 an industrial GDP of R $128.4 billion, equivalent to 10.7% of the national industry. It employs 1,069,469 workers in the industry. The main industrial sectors are: Construction (17.9%), Extraction of Metallic Minerals (15.2%), Food (13.4%), Industrial Services of Public Utility, such as Electricity and Water (10.8%) and Metallurgy (10.5%). These 5 sectors concentrate 67.8% of the state's industry.

In Rio de Janeiro in 2017 had an industrial GDP of R $104.6 billion, equivalent to 8.7% of the national industry and employing 556,283 workers in the industry. The main industrial sectors in Rio are: Construction (22.6%), Extraction of Oil and Natural Gas (22.3%), Industrial Services of Public Utility, such as Electricity and Water (14.3%), Petroleum Products and Biofuels (14.1%) and Chemicals (3.6%). These 5 sectors concentrate 76.9% of the state's industry.

Paraná had an industrial GDP of R $92.8 billion in 2017, equivalent to 7.8% of the national industry. It employs 763,064 workers in the industry. The main industrial sectors are: Food (19.1%), Industrial Services of Public Utility, such as Electricity and Water (18.5%), Construction (17.3%), Motor Vehicles (8.1%), and Petroleum Derivatives and Biofuels (5.7%). These 5 sectors concentrate 68.7% of the state's industry.

In 2017, Rio Grande do Sul had an industrial GDP of R $82.1 billion, equivalent to 6.9% of the national industry. It employs 762,045 workers in the industry. The main industrial sectors are: Construction (18.2%), Food (15.4%), Industrial Public Utility Services, such as Electricity and Water (9.8%), Chemicals (6.8%), and Machinery and Equipment (6.6%). These 5 sectors concentrate 56.8% of the state's industry.

Santa Catarina had an industrial GDP of R $63.2 billion in 2017, equivalent to 5.3% of the national industry. It employs 761,072 workers in the industry. The main industrial sectors are: Construction (17.9%), Food (15.9%), Clothing (7.4%), Industrial Public Utility Services, such as Electricity and Water (6.9%), and Textiles (6.0%). These 5 sectors concentrate 54.1% of the state's industry.

Goiás had in 2017 an industrial GDP of R $37.1 billion, equivalent to 3.1% of the national industry. It employs 302,952 workers in the industry. The main industrial sectors are: Construction (25.6%), Food (25.2%), Industrial Public Utility Services, such as Electricity and Water (17.2%) and Petroleum Products and Biofuels (7.4%) and Chemicals (3.7%). These 5 sectors concentrate 79.1% of the state's industry.

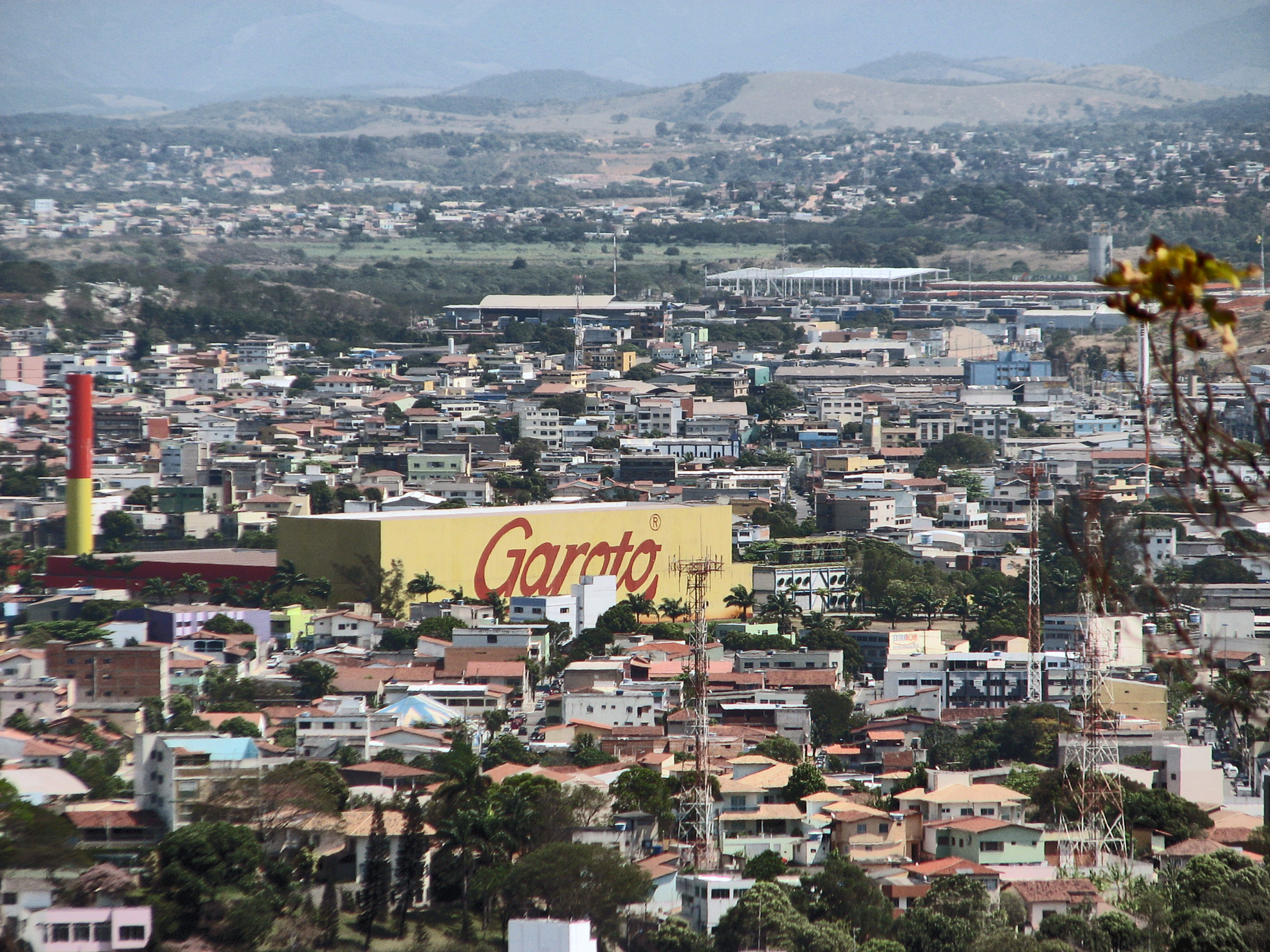
Garoto chocolate factory in Vila Velha.

Espírito Santo in 2017 had an industrial GDP of R $21.3 billion, equivalent to 1.8% of the national industry. It employs 168,357 workers in the industry. The main industrial sectors are: Extraction of Oil and Natural Gas (23.0%), Construction (20.5%), Industrial Services of Public Utility, such as Electricity and Water (12.3%), Metallurgy (7.5%) and Pulp and Paper (6.6%). These 5 sectors concentrate 69.9% of the state's industry.

Mato Grosso do Sul had an industrial GDP of R $19.1 billion in 2017, equivalent to 1.6% of the national industry. It employs 122,162 workers in the industry. The main industrial sectors are: Public Utility Industrial Services, such as Electricity and Water (23.2%), Construction (20.8%), Food (15.8%), Pulp and Paper (15.1%) and Petroleum Derivatives and Biofuels (12.5%). These 5 sectors concentrate 87.4% of the state's industry.

Mato Grosso had an industrial GDP of R $17.0 billion in 2017, equivalent to 1.4% of the national industry. It employs 141,121 workers in the industry. The main industrial sectors are: Construction (32.0%), Food (27.9%), Industrial Services of Public Utility, such as Electricity and Water (18.6%), Beverages (4.5%) and Oil Products Oil and Biofuels (3.9%). These 5 sectors concentrate 86.9% of the state's industry.

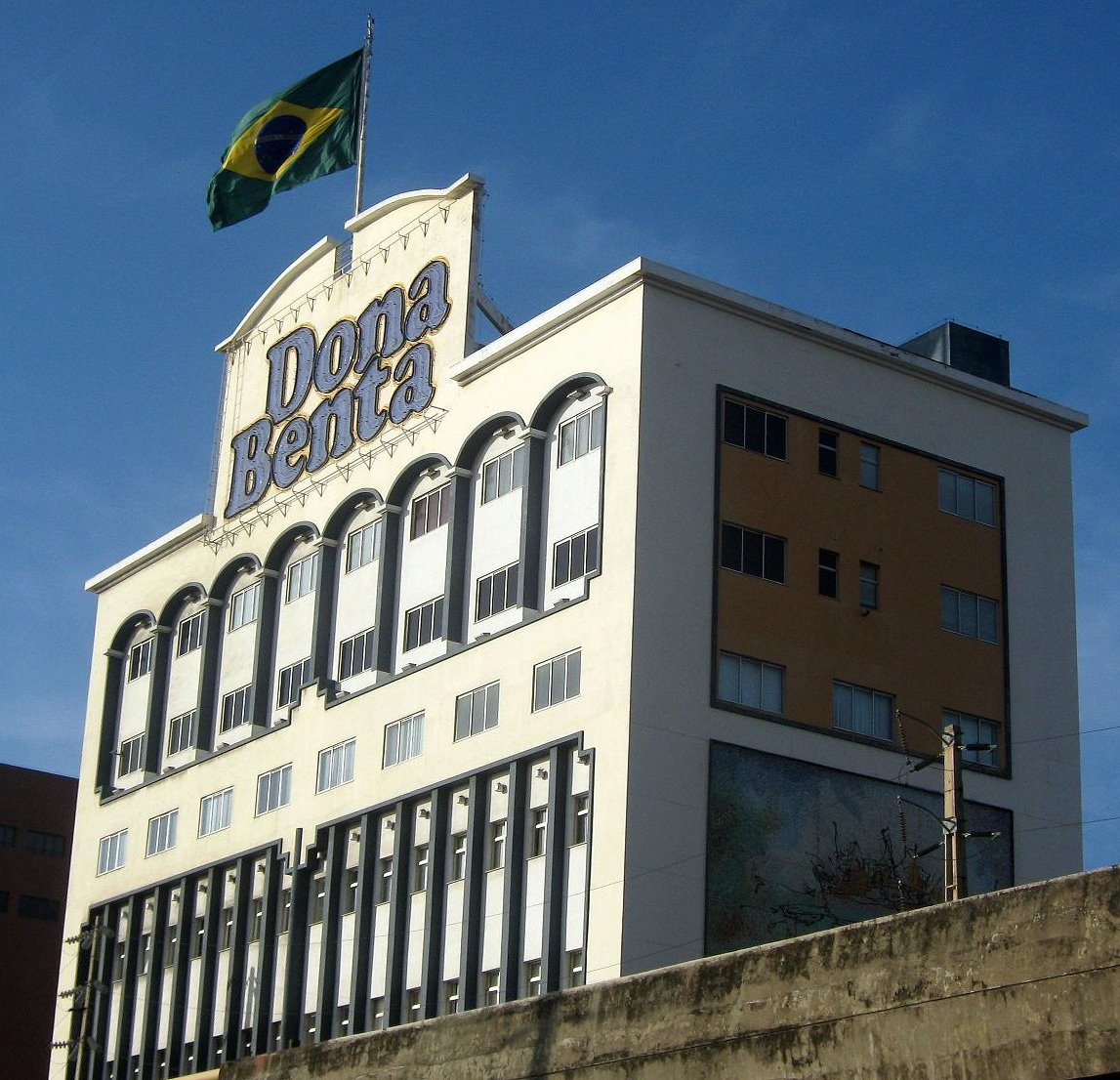
J. Macêdo, one of the largest pasta industries in Brazil, in Fortaleza..

The Federal District had an industrial GDP of R $8.4 billion in 2017, equivalent to 0.7% of the national industry. It employs 82,163 workers in the industry. The main industrial sectors are: Construction (53.4%), Industrial Services of Public Utility, such as Electricity and Water (22.2%), Food (7.2%), Beverages (6.0%) and Non-minerals -metallics (3.0%). These 5 sectors concentrate 91.8% of the state's industry.

In Northeast Region, Bahia has 4.4% of the national industrial GDP, Pernambuco 2.7%, Ceará 1.9%, Maranhão 1.1%, Rio Grande do Norte 0.9%, Paraíba 0.7%, Sergipe 0.6%, Alagoas 0.5% and Piauí 0.4%, num overall total of approximately 13.2%.

In the Northern Region, Pará has 3.7% of the national industrial GDP, Amazonas 2.2%, Rondônia 0.7%, Tocantins 0.4%, Amapá 0.1%, Acre 0.1% and Roraima 0.1%, in an overall total of approximately 7.3%.

== Energy ==
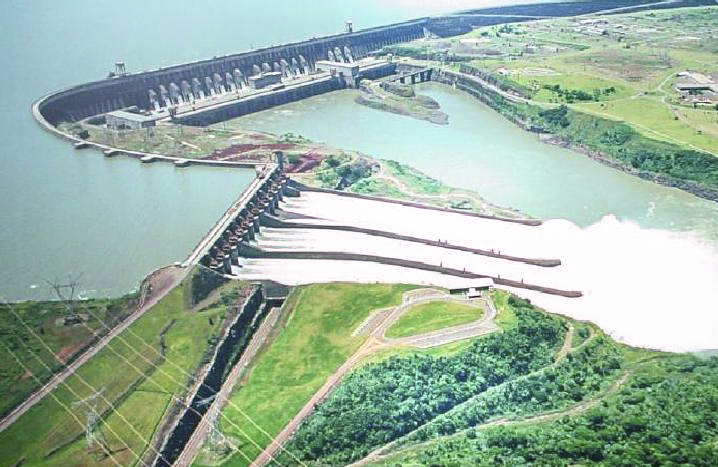
Itaipu Dam in Paraná.

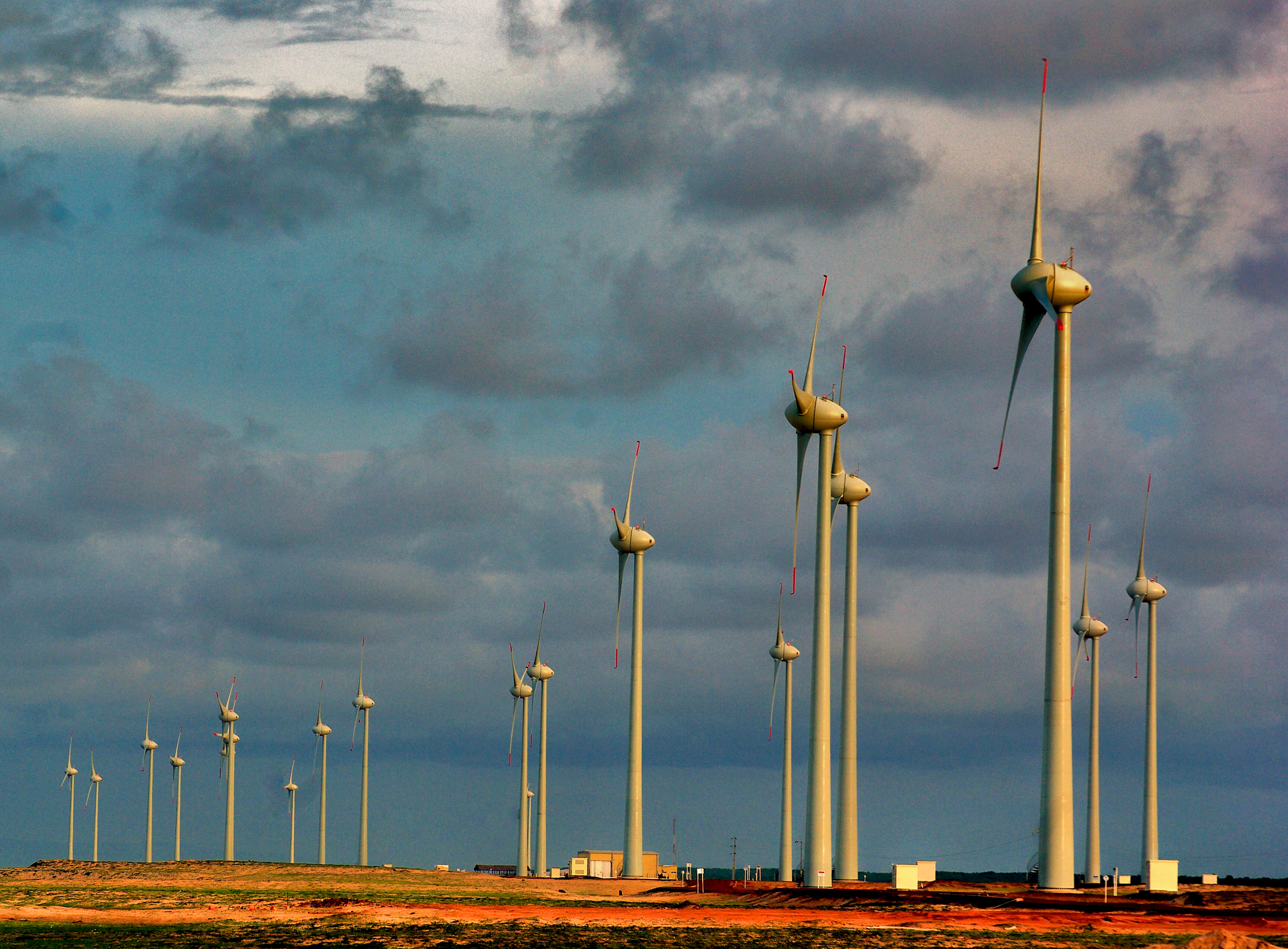
Wind power in Parnaíba.

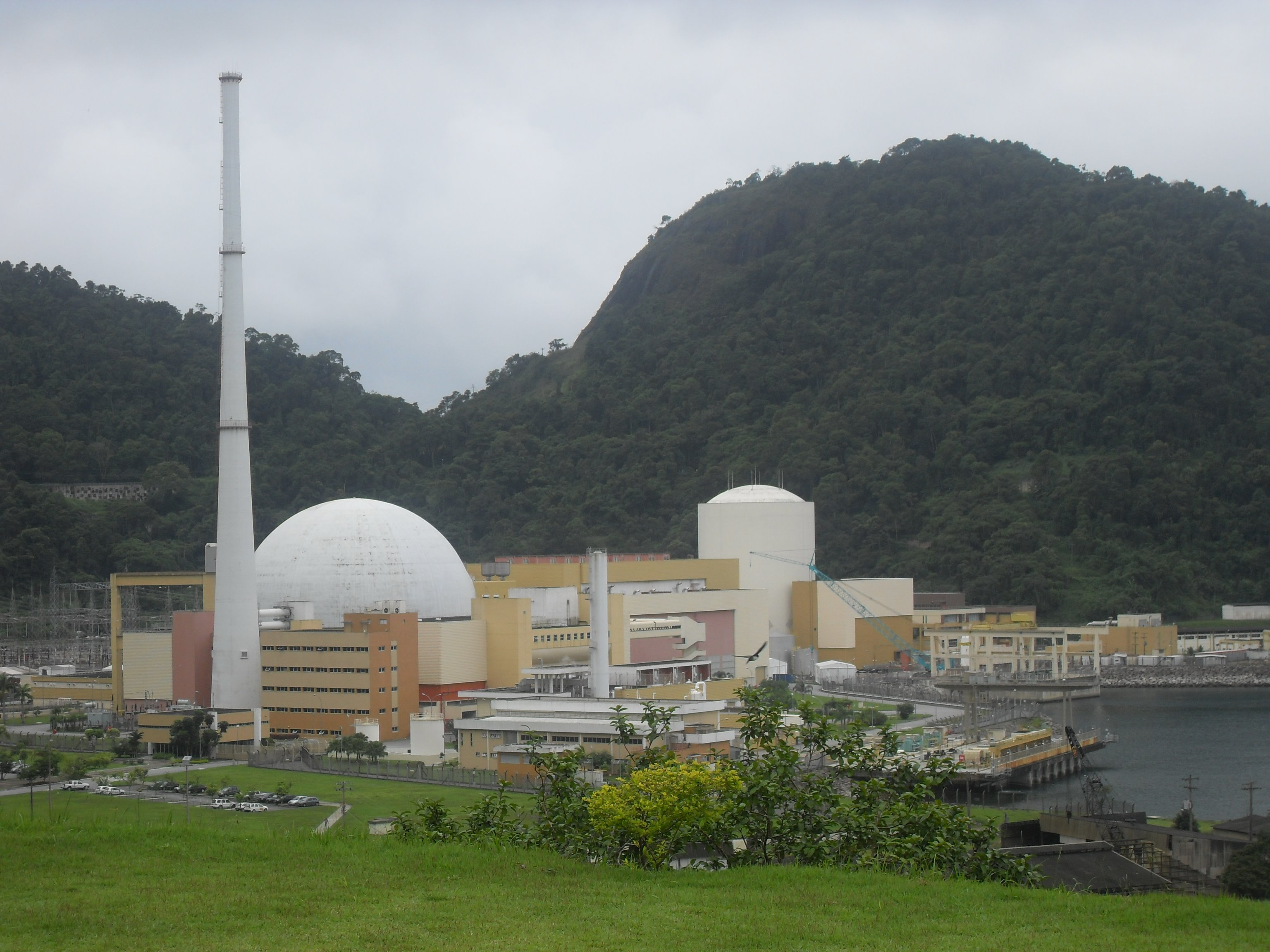
Angra Nuclear Power Plant in Angra dos Reis, Rio de Janeiro

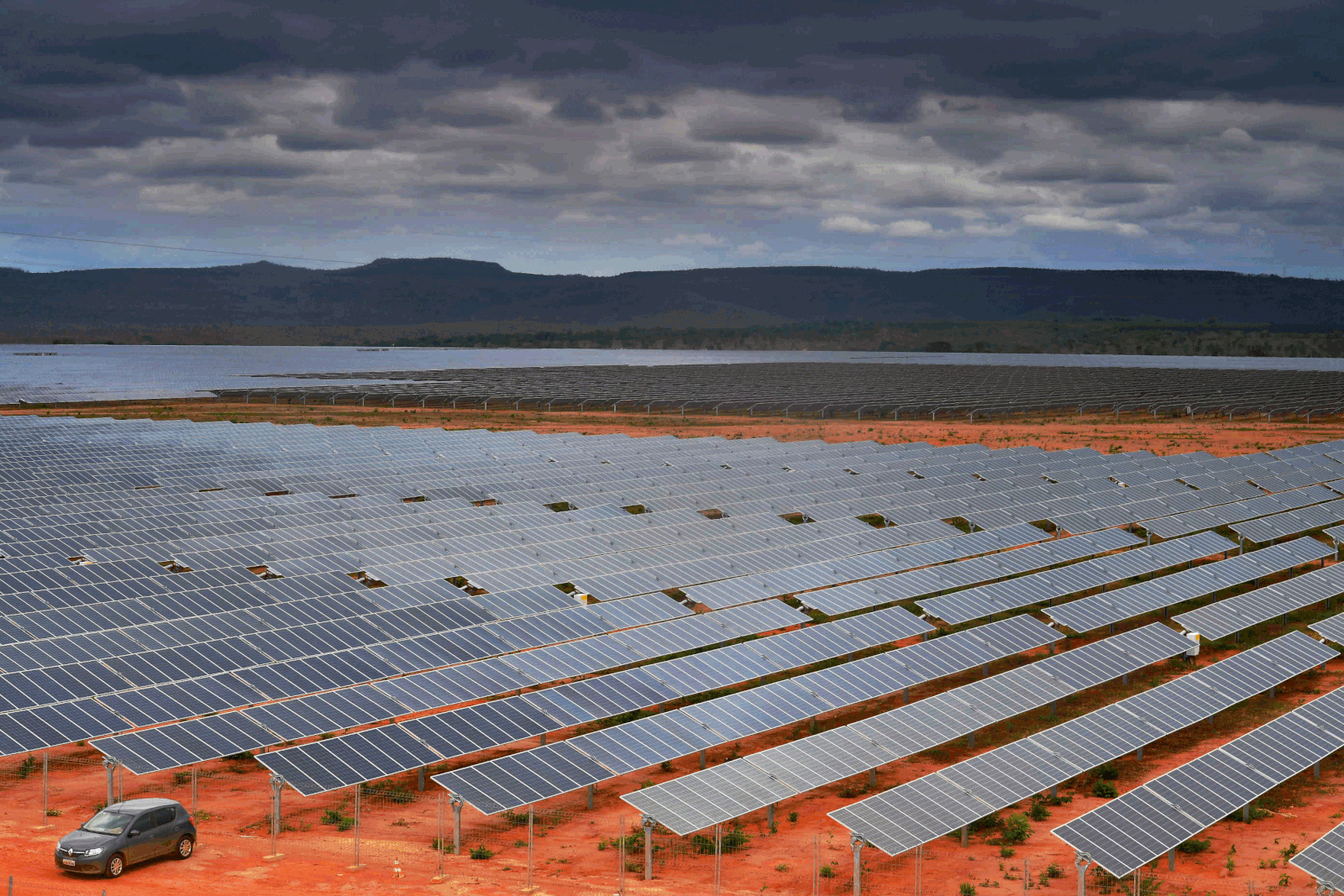
Pirapora Solar Complex, the largest in Brazil and Latin America, with a capacity of 321 MW.

The main characteristic of the Brazilian energy matrix is that it is much more renewable than that of the world. While in 2019 the world matrix was only 14% made up of renewable energy, Brazil's was at 45%. Petroleum and oil products made up 34.3% of the matrix; sugar cane derivatives, 18%; hydraulic energy, 12.4%; natural gas, 12.2%; firewood and charcoal, 8.8%; varied renewable energies, 7%; mineral coal, 5.3%; nuclear, 1.4%, and other non-renewable energies, 0.6%.

In the electric energy matrix, the difference between Brazil and the world is even greater: while the world only had 25% of renewable electric energy in 2019, Brazil had 83%. The Brazilian electric matrix is composed of: hydraulic energy, 64.9%; biomass, 8.4%; wind energy, 8.6%; solar energy, 1%; natural gas, 9.3%; oil products, 2%; nuclear, 2.5%; coal and derivatives, 3.3%.

In total electricity generation, in 2019 Brazil reached 170,000 megawatts of installed capacity, more than 75% from renewable sources (the majority, hydroelectric plants). In 2019, Brazil had 217 hydroelectric plants in operation, with an installed capacity of 98,581 MW, 60.16% of the country's energy generation. Brazil is one of the 5 largest hydroelectric energy producers in the world (2nd place in 2017).

In 2013, the Southeast used about 50% of the load of the National Integrated System (SIN), being the main energy consuming region in the country. The region's installed electricity generation capacity totaled almost 42,500 MW, which represented about a third of Brazil's generation capacity. The hydroelectric generation represented 58% of the installed capacity in the region, with the remaining 42% basically corresponding to the thermoelectric generation. São Paulo accounted for 40% of this capacity; Minas Gerais by about 25%; Rio de Janeiro by 13.3%; and Espírito Santo for the rest. Among the renewable sources for thermoelectric generation, sugar cane biomass stands out, with more than 6,300 MW of capacity, distributed in more than 230 plants. Among the non-renewable sources, natural gas, with almost 6,300 MW, thermonuclear generation, with 2,000 MW, and oil products, with 1,100 MW.

The South Region has the Itaipu Dam, which was the largest hydroelectric plant in the world for several years, until the inauguration of the Three Gorges Dam in China. The region is also the only one in the country that produces coal and oil shale.

Northern Brazil has large hydroelectric plants such as Belo Monte and Tucuruí, which produce much of the national energy.

Brazil's hydroelectric potential has not yet been fully explored, so the country still has the capacity to build several renewable energy plants in its territory.

In the Northeast region, the installation of wind farms is multiplying. In 2019, it was estimated that the country had an estimated wind power generation potential of around 522 GW (this, only onshore), enough energy to meet three times the country's current demand. As of January 2022, according to ONS, total installed capacity of wind power was 21 GW, with average capacity factor of 58%. While the world average wind production capacity factors is 24.7%, there are areas in Northern Brazil, specially in Bahia State, where some wind farms record with average capacity factors over 60%; the average capacity factor in the Northeast Region is 45% in the coast and 49% in the interior. In 2019, wind energy represented 9% of the energy generated in the country. Brazil is one of the 10 largest wind energy producers in the world (8th place in 2019, with 2.4% of world production).

Brazil also has 3 atomic plants. In Angra dos Reis, in the state of Rio de Janeiro, is the Central Nuclear Almirante Álvaro Alberto, a complex formed by the group of nuclear plants 'Angra 1' , 'Angra 2' and 'Angra 3' (under construction), owned by Eletronuclear, a subsidiary of Eletrobras. The complex produces three percent of the National Interconnected System electricity consumption. The total power of the plants is 2007 MW, of which 657 MW in Angra 1 and 1350 MW in Angra 2. Additionally, the Angra 3 nuclear plant, which will have a capacity of 1405 MW, is under construction.

As of March 2022, according to ONS, total installed capacity of photovoltaic solar was 14 GW, with average capacity factor of 23%. Some of the most irradiated Brazilian States are MG ("Minas Gerais"), BA ("Bahia") and GO (Goiás), which have indeed world irradiation level records. In 2019, solar power represented 1.27% of the energy generated in the country. In 2020, Brazil was the 14th country in the world in terms of installed solar power (7.8 GW).

In 2020, Brazil was the 2nd largest country in the world in the production of energy through biomass (energy production from solid biofuels and renewable waste), with 15,2 GW installed.

== Cars ==
Brazilian automobile production began in 1957, with an initial production of 1,166 units in the first year. Most production is concentrated in the states of São Paulo, Minas Gerais and Paraná.

The automotive industry in Brazil boomed after ex-president Fernando Collor de Mello opened up the market in 1990, but high production costs, high taxes and technology deficits are barriers that Brazil is still struggling to defeat.

Brazil's automotive industry has been displaying impressive two-digit growth over the last years, totaling revenues over US$100 billion by the end of 2010. These figures secured Brazil the fourth position amongst the largest car markets in the world (one position ahead of Germany). The industry generates 1.5 million jobs.

The perspective of a steady development of the industry is attracting billions in investments to the country. BMW announced in December 2011 plans to set up a plant in São Paulo, and by 2014 Chinese manufacturer JAC Motors was to officially start production on the assembly line being built in Bahia state.

Automobile production
| Year | 1960 | 1970 | 1980 | 1990 | 2000 | 2004 | 2005 | 2007 | 2008 |
| Units (in millions) | 0.042 | 0.306 | 0.933 | 0.663 | 1.36 | 1.86 | 2.50 | 2.61 | 2.97 |

== Petroleum ==
The northeast shore of the Bay of All Saints was home to Brazil's first active oil fields. The municipality of São Francisco do Conde at the north of the bay remains a port serving the refineries at Mataripe. The bay is dredged from the port to the Atlantic Ocean to remain open to shipping.

Petroleum production
| Year | 1960 | 1970 | 1980 | 1990 | 2000 | 2006 |
| Thousand barrels per day | 83 | 169 | 189 | 653 | 1,271 | 1,809 |

== Statistics ==
Electricity:

- production: 380 TWh (2004)
- consumption: 391 TWh (2004)

Electricity - production by source: (2004)

- other sources: 9%
- hydroelectric: 83%
- conventional thermal: 4%
- nuclear: 4%

Oil:

- production: 2.165 million barrel/day (2006)
- consumption: 2.216 million barrel/day (2006)
- imports: 0.051 million barrel/day (2006)
- proven reserves: 11.2 billion barrels (2006)
- refinery capacity: 1.908 million barrel/day (2006)

Natural gas:

- production: 9.88 billion cubic kilometers (2006)
- consumption: 19.34 billion cubic kilometers (2006)
- imports: 9.45 billion cubic kilometers (2006)
- proven reserves: 326 billion cubic kilometers (2006)

== See also ==
- Automotive industry in Brazil
- Ministry of Development, Industry and Foreign Trade
- Deindustrialization of Brazil

== Bibliography ==
- Furtado, Celso. Formação econômica do Brasil. (http://www.afoiceeomartelo.com.br/posfsa/Autores/Furtado,%20Celso/Celso%20Furtado%20-%20Forma%C3%A7%C3%A3o%20Econ%C3%B4mica%20do%20Brasil.pdf)
- Prado Junior, Caio. História econômica do Brasil. (http://www.afoiceeomartelo.com.br/posfsa/Autores/Prado%20Jr,%20Caio/Historia%20Economica%20do%20Brasil.pdf)
- Graça Filho, Afonso de Alencastro. A economia do Império brasileiro. São Paulo: Atual, 2004. (in Portuguese)
- Scantimburgo, João de. O Poder Moderador. São Paulo: Secretaria de Estado da Cultura, 1980. (in Portuguese)
- Silva, Hélio. 1889 - A república não esperou o amanhecer. Porto Alegre: L&PM, 2005. (in Portuguese)
- Sodré, Nelson Werneck. Panorama do Segundo Império, 2. ed. Rio de Janeiro: GRAPHIA, 2004. (in Portuguese)
- Szmrecsány, Tamás and Lapa, José Roberto do Amaral. História Econômica da Independência e do Império, 2. ed. São Paulo: USP, 2002. (in Portuguese)
- Vainfas, Ronaldo. Dicionário do Brasil Imperial. Rio de Janeiro: Objetiva, 2002. (in Portuguese)
- 15. ed. São Paulo: Melhoramentos, 1994. (in Portuguese)
