= Mato Leitão =

Municipality of Rio Grande do Sul, Brazil

- Municipality/City
- Município de Mato Leitão
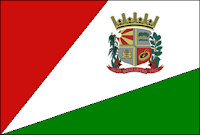
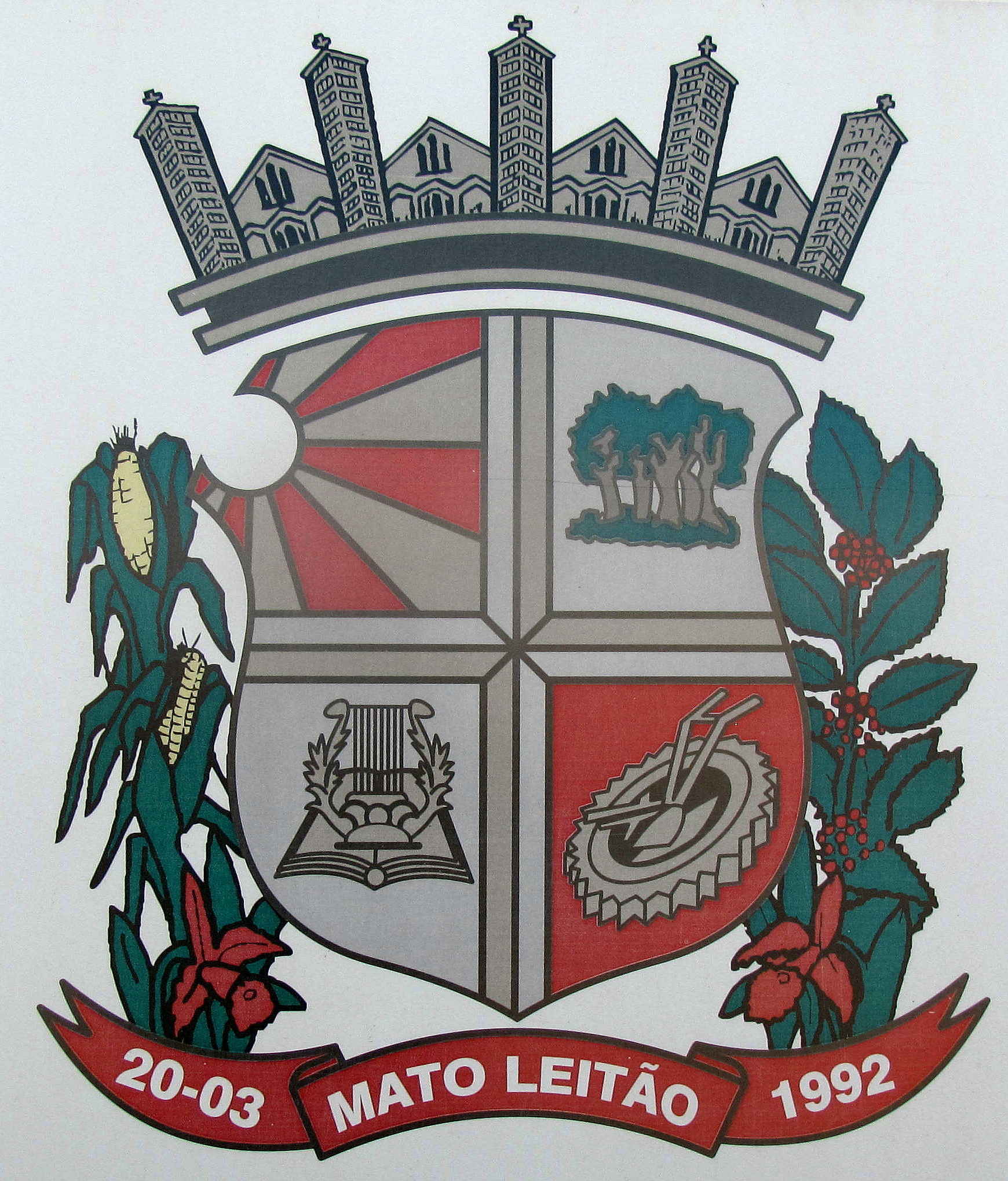
- Flag Coat of arms
- Nickname: Capital of Ochids
- Location within Rio Grande do Sul

- Location in the Brazil
- Coordinates: 29°31′32″S 52°07′36″W
- Emancipação: March 20, 1992

Government
  - Type: Mayor government
  - Body: Prefeitura de Mato Leitão
  - Prefeito(a): Carmen Goerck, PP

Area
  - Total: 17.7 sq mi (46 km^{2})
- Elevation: 266 ft (81 m)

Population
  - Total: 4,573
  - Density: 258/sq mi (99.8/km^{2})
  - Urban: 1,621
  - Rural: 2,244
  - Urbanization Rate (2010): 41.9%
- Demonym: Matoleitoense
- Time zone: UTC−3 (BRT)
- ZIP code(s): 95835000
- Website: www.matoleitao-rs.com.br

Mato Leitão is a municipality in the state of Rio Grande do Sul, Brazil.

== Geography ==
Mato Leitão is located at a latitude 29º31'28" south and a longitude 52º07'43" west, being at an altitude of 81 meters (266 feet).

It has an area of 45.9 km^{2} (17.7 mi^{2}) and a population of 3 869 inhabitants (2010).

In the main avenue of the city, Leopoldo A. Hinterholz Av., are located the cathedral, the prefecture, the SEUBV and most of the local trade.

== Culture and economy ==
Known as the "Capital of the beautiful woman" and the "City of Orchids", Mato Leitão is a city of German colonization that has its economy based on agriculture - especially corn and tobacco - and food and footwear industry.

German cookery and festivities. A curiosity is that there are many localities in Mato Leitão where people preferentially speak German to Portuguese.

== Quality of life ==
There are four schools in Mato Leitão, only one with High Schools' studies. However, Mato Leitão is considered as a reference in education, being in the top 15 at the state. Similarly, public health is a source of pride.

As an example, Mato Leitão has a 96.2% literacy rate and HDI of 0.746.

Crimes like thefts and murders are extremely rare in Mato Leitao.

== See also ==
- List of municipalities in Rio Grande do Sul
