= Estaleiro Atlântico Sul =

Brazilian shipbuilding company

Coordinates: 8.3783°S 34.9708°W

EAS S.A
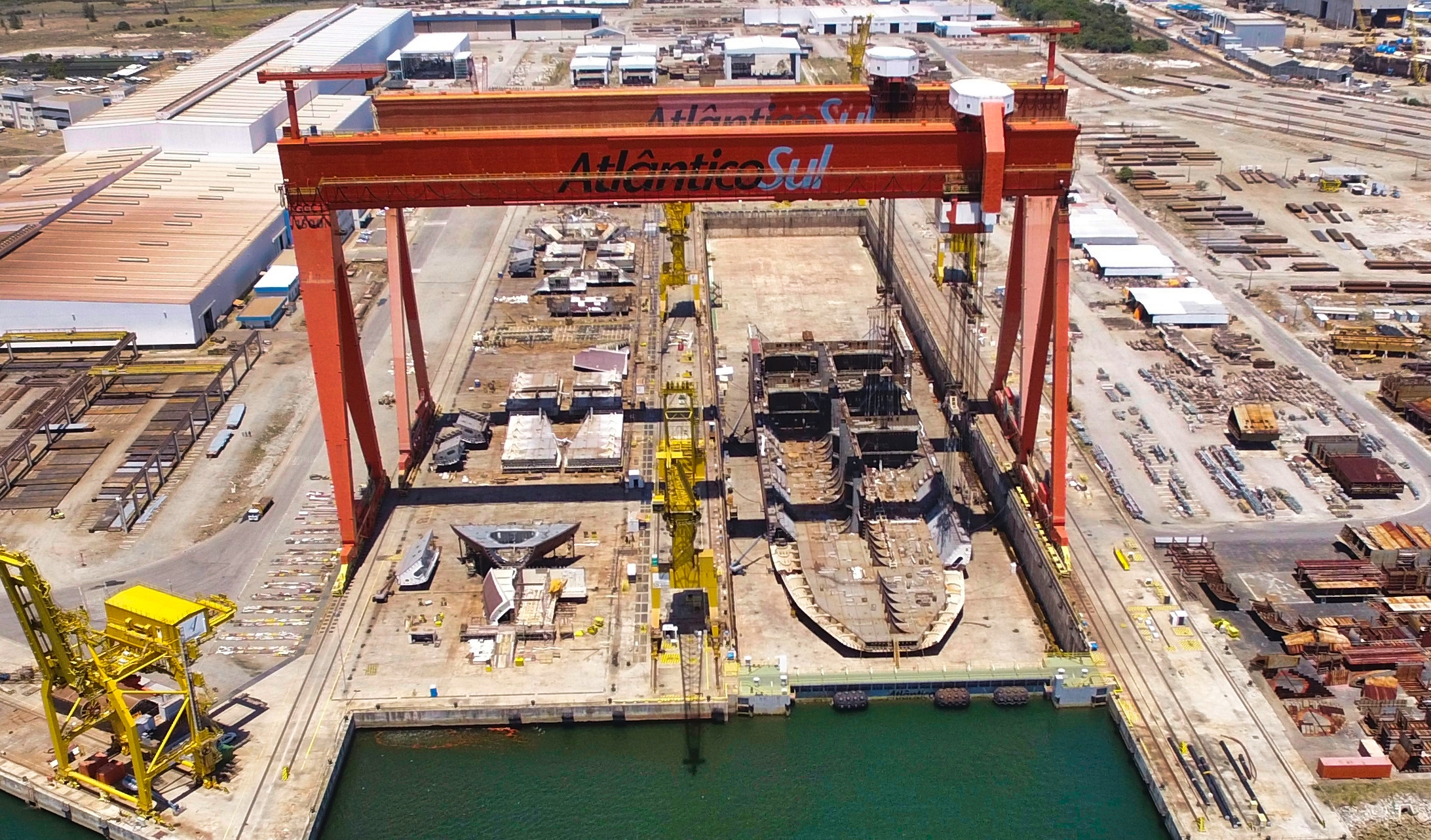
- Suape industrial and port complex.
- Native name: Estaleiro Atlântico Sul
- Company type: Sociedade Anônima
- Industry: Shipbuilding
- Founded: 2005; 21 years ago
- Headquarters: Ipojuca, Pernambuco, Brazil
- Area served: Latin America, Asia
- Products: FPSO, Oil tanker, Oil platform, Fishing Vessels, Work boats, Platform supply vessels, Research vessels, Tugboats
- Services: Shipbuilding and services
- Owner: Mover Participações (49,5%); Queiroz Galvão Naval (33%)

Estaleiro Atlântico Sul (EAS) is a Brazilian shipbuilding company. Estaleiro Atlântico was founded in 2005 by Samsung Heavy Industries, construction groups Grupo Camargo Corrêa and Grupo Queiroz Galvão in response to growing demand in the shipbuilding market in Brazil. Samsung Heavy Industries sold its minority stake in Estaleiro Atlântico Sul to its partners, Camargo Corrêa Naval and Queiroz Galvão Participações. With a 6% stake, Samsung was the partner with a technological basis. and Samsung in South Korea supplied the shipbuilding technology. The shipyard facility is located in the deep water port of Suape, in the state of Pernambuco, and is situated between the municipalities of Ipojuca and Cabo de Santo Agostinho, at the mouth of the Ipojuca River, about 40 km from the major city of Recife. The dry dock, with two, 1500 ton wing gates has a length of 400 meters, is 73 meters wide and had a water depth of 12 meters.

In 2019, the shipyard closed its activities in the Suape Industrial Port Complex. It resumed operations in October 2021.

== History ==
The shipyard consortium received its first major order from Petrobras in 2010 for a series of 49 Suezmax tanker-class vessels. However, it had problems finding workers right from the start. For example, there was a shortage of welders. The shipyard operators retrained sugar cane workers and housewives, but the result was so poor that the first oil tanker ordered by Petrobras, "João Cândido," showed leaks at the welds as early as the launch in 2011. As a result, the João Cândido was not certified until April 2012. Samsung withdrew from the joint venture after this mishap. The new partner is now a subsidiary of the Japanese Mitsui Group.

After the start-up difficulties ended, Petrobras stuck to its mission. Today, the company says it employs around 2800 people and is an important employer for the residents of the low-income five communities surrounding the shipyard.

In May 2013, the company was also able to hand over another Suezmax tanker "Zumbi dos Palmares" with a length of 274.2 meters to the client Petrobras Transporte S.A. without any problems.

The EAS was also involved in the construction of the P-55 drilling platform, Petrobras largest semi-submersible platform capable of producing up to 180,000 barrels of oil and six million cubic meters of natural gas per day. It started work in early 2014 at the Roncador oil field in the Campos Basin off the coast of Brazil.

== Recent vessel production ==
A not extensive list of Atlântico Sul's production:

| Name | Launched | Size | Note |
|---|---|---|---|
| João Cândido | 7 May 2010 | 157,055 DWT | Oil tanker |
| Zumbi dos Palmares | 29 November 2011 | 157,700 DWT | Oil tanker |
| Dragão do Mar | 23 August 2013 | 157,055 DWT | Oil tanker |
| Portinari | 27 June 2020 | 114,000 DWT | Oil tanker |

== See also ==
- Exclusive economic zone of Brazil
- Pre-salt layer
- Estaleiro Mauá
