= Legislation of the Provisional Government of Hong Kong =

This is a list of bills that were introduced and passed into law and became ordinances of the territory by the Provisional Legislative Council that sat for a year from July 1997 to 1998. Laws passed before 1 July 1997 were passed by the provisional legislature that sat while the outgoing legislature was still sitting. They were not in effect until the provisional legislature started its officially sittings and took over as the legislature of the territory on 1 July 1997.

== Pre-Handover ==
- Holidays (1997 and 1998) Bill - replaced former Ordinance and holidays like the Queen's Birthday and Liberation Day with National holidays of China and Reunification Day
- Urban Council (Amendment) Bill 1997 - renaming it as Provisional Urban Council
- Regional Council (Amendment) Bill 1997 - renaming it as Provisional Regional Council
- District Boards (Amendment) Bill 1997 - renaming them as Provisional District Councils
- The Legislative Council Commission (Amendment) Bill 1997
- National Flag and National Emblem Bill - replaces former Ordinance and former symbols of British Hong Kong
- Regional Flag and Regional Emblem Bill - replaces former Ordinance and former symbols of British Hong Kong
- Societies (Amendment) Bill 1997
- Public Order (Amendment) Bill 1997
- Hong Kong Court of Final Appeal (Amendment) Bill 1997 - replaces the role of the Supreme Court of Hong Kong (High Court), references to the Attorney General of Hong Kong, Governor of Hong Kong
- Judicial Service Commission (Amendment) Bill 1997
- Immigration (Amendment) (No.3) Bill 1997 - regards to the HKSAR passport
- Oaths and Declarations (Amendment) Bill 1997 - removes reference to Colonial Affidavits Act 1859, Supreme Court of Hong Kong, Commissioner for Oaths Acts 1889 and 1891

== Post Handover ==
- Hong Kong Reunification Bill
- United Nations Sanctions Bill
- Hong Kong Special Administrative Region Passport Bill
- Immigration (Amendment) (No.5) Bill 1997
- Chinese Nationality (Miscellaneous Provisions) Bill
- Legislative Provisions (Suspension of Operation) Bill 1997
- Electoral Affairs Commission Bill
- Inland Revenue (Amendment) (No.3) Bill 1997
- Dutiable Commodities (Amendment) (No.2) Bill 1997
- Legislative Council Bill - replaces the role of the Boundary and Election Commission with the Election Commission
- Hong Kong Court of Final Appeal (Amendment) (No.2) Bill 1997
- Hong Kong Court of Final Appeal (Amendment) (No.3) Bill 1997
- Employment and Labour Relations (Miscellaneous Amendments) Bill 1997
- Employment (Amendment) (No.5) Bill 1997
- Occupational Deafness (Compensation) (Amendment) (No.2) Bill 1997
- Sex Discrimination (Amendment) Bill 1997
- Cross-Harbour Tunnel (Cross-Harbour Tunnel Regulations) (Amendment) Ordinance 1997 (Amendment) Bill 1997
- Tate's Cairn Tunnel (Tate's Cairn Tunnel Regulations) (Amendment) Ordinance 1997 (Amendment) Bill 1997
- Provident Fund Schemes Legislation (Amendment) Bill 1997
- Mass Transit Railway Corporation (Amenemdnt) Bill 1997
- Protection of the Harbour (Amendment) Bill 1997
- Housing (Amendment) (No. 3) Bill 1997
- Immigration (Amendment) Bill 1998
- Housing (Amendment) Bill 1998
- Hong Kong Bill of Rights (Amendment) Bill 1998 - amended Sections 3(3) and 4 of the Hong Kong Bill of Rights Ordinance (1991) that contradicted with the Hong Kong Basic Law Article 39
- Land (Compulsory Sale for Redevelopment) Bill
- Prevention of Copyright Piracy Bill
- Fire Safety (Commercial Premises) (Amendment) Bill 1998
- Criminal Procedure (Amendment) Bill 1998
- Foreshore and Sea-bed (Reclamations) (Amendment) Bill 1998
- Roads (Works, Use and Compensation) (Amendment) Bill 1998
- Road Traffic (Validation of Collection of Fees) Bill
- Kowloon-Canton Railway Corporation (Amendment) Bill 1998
- Building Management (Amendment) Bill 1998
- Adaptation of Laws (Courts and Tribunals) Bill
- Adaptation of Laws (References to Foreign Country, Etc.) Bill
- Merchant Shipping (Registration) (Amendment) Bill 1998
- Adaptation of Laws (Crown Land) Bill
- Legal Practitioners (Amendment) Bill 1998
- Town Planning (Amendment) Bill 1998
- Appropriation Bill 1998
- Adaptation of Laws (Interpretative Provisions) Bill
- Adaptation of Laws (Nationality Related Matters) Bill
- Inland Revenue (Amendment) Bill 1998
- Inland Revenue (Amendment) (No. 2) Bill 1998
- Stamp Duty (Amendment) Bill 1998
- Stamp Duty (Amendment) (No. 2) Bill 1998
- Estate Duty (Amendment) Bill 1998
- Dutiable Commodities (Amendment) Bill 1998
- Air Passenger Departure Tax (Amendment) Bill 1998

Once passed, these bills became law or Ordinances.

== Other Site ==
- Provisional Legislative Council Bills
