= Inheritance tax =

Tax paid after inheritance of property

International tax law distinguishes between an estate tax and an inheritance tax. An inheritance tax is a tax paid by a person who inherits money or property of a person who has died, whereas an estate tax is a levy on the estate (money and property) of a person who has died. However, this distinction is not always observed; for example, the UK's "inheritance tax" is a tax on the assets of the deceased, and strictly speaking is therefore an estate tax. Inheritance taxes vary widely between countries.

== History ==
There was a steep increase in the number of countries that implemented inheritance taxes throughout the 19th and early 20th century. From 1960 onwards, inheritance taxes declined in prevalence as numerous countries repealed theirs. For historical reasons, the term "death duty" is still used colloquially (though not legally) in the UK and some Commonwealth countries. The estate tax in the United States is sometimes referred as "death tax".

== Other taxation applied to inheritance ==
In some jurisdictions, when assets are transferred by inheritance, any unrealized increase in asset value is subject to capital gains tax, payable immediately. This is the case in Canada, which has no inheritance tax. When a jurisdiction has both capital gains tax and inheritance tax, inheritances are generally exempt from capital gains tax.

In some jurisdictions, like Austria, death gives rise to the local equivalent of gift tax. This was the UK model before the Inheritance Tax in 1986 was introduced, when estates were charged to a form of gift tax called Capital Transfer Tax. Where a jurisdiction has both gift tax and inheritance tax, it is usual to exempt inheritances from gift tax. Also, it is common for inheritance taxes to share some features of gift taxes, by taxing some transfers which happen during the lifetime of the giver rather than on death. The UK, for example, subjects "lifetime chargeable transfers" (usually gifts to trusts) to inheritance tax.

== Arguments ==
Arguments for inheritance taxes include reduction of discrimination between inherited income and income from work due to taxing at different tax rates. Inheritance has been compared to nepotism and inconsistent with the values of capitalism. Inheritance tax has been argued to be preferable to income tax on work or land value tax.

Arguments against inheritance taxes include loss aversion to kinship. Differences in inheritance taxes on trusts and estates of natural persons have been described by one article as inequitable. Georg Hegel viewed families as legal persons, which is reflected in German inheritance laws for family firms.

== By country ==
- Belgium: droits de succession or erfbelasting (Inheritance tax). Collected at the federal level but distributed to the regional level. In the 2018 huge set of reforms, considering inheritance taxes, was accepted on the federal level and thus many changes on the regional level were also made. Since 2018, family homes are exempt from tax in all regions if it is bequeathed to a direct-line family member, spouse, or cohabitant.
- Bermuda: stamp duty.
- Brazil: Imposto sobre Transmissão "Causa Mortis" e Doação de Quaisquer Bens ou Direitos (lit. Tax on Causa Mortis Transmission and as Donation of any Property and Rights). Collected at the state level. Brazilian States can charge progressive rates for the ITCMD, increasing the rate according to the amount donated or inherited, however, the Brazilian Senate limited the maximum rate to 8%.
- China: No inheritance tax exists.
- Colombia: No inheritance tax, however the inheritance is considered as extraordinary income, therefore it is subject to capital gains tax.
- Denmark: Boafgift (estate duty). Collected at state level. Different rates depending on the relation to the deceased. Spouse: 0%. Children: 15%. Other relatives: 15% of the estate sum plus an additional 25% of the individual sum. The estate duty is calculated on the sum of the estate after deducting a free allowance on the estate (289,000 DKK in 2018).
- Finland: perintövero (Finnish) or arvsskatt (Swedish) is a state tax. Inheritance to the close family is tax free up to the worth of €20,000, and increasing from there via several steps (for instance, being 13% for €60,000–€200,000) to the maximum of 19% that must be paid for the portion of the inheritance that exceeds one million euros. Taxation is more severe in the case of remote relatives or those with no family connection at all (19–33%).
- France: droits de succession. Inheritance to the close family is tax-free up to the worth of €100,000, and increasing from there via several steps to the maximum of 45% that must be paid for the portion of the inheritance that exceeds 1.8 million euros. Taxation is more severe in case of remote relatives or those with no family connection at all (55–60%).
- Germany: Erbschaftsteuer. Smaller bequests are exempt, i.e., €20,000–€500,000 depending on the family relation between the deceased and the beneficiary. Bequests larger than these values are taxed from 7% to 50%, depending on the family relationship between the deceased and the beneficiary and the size of the taxable amount.
- Ghana: Inheritance tax on intangible assets.
- Greece: The inheritance tax in Greece is different for different groups based on the degree of relationship with the deceased. Heirs are divided into three groups and within each group there are also separate rates for various values of the inherited property. Category A includes the spouse, children, grandchildren and parents and the rate is between 0 and 10%. For category B, including great-grandchildren, grandparents and great-grandparents, siblings etc., it is from 0 to 20% and for the rest in the category C it is from 0 (for very low inheritance) to 40%.
- Iceland: Inheritance tax is 10%. The first ISK 5,757,759 is tax free.
- Iraq: The taxation of inheritance depends on the value of the property inherited. There are different 5 tax rates. To the value of IQD 20 million the inheritance is tax free. From IQD 20 million to IQD 30 million the rate is 3%, from IQD 30 million to IQD 60 million it is 4%, from IQD 60 million to IQD 90 million 5% and the highest is for inheritance over IQD 90 million 6%.
- Ireland: Inheritance tax (Irish: Cáin Oidhreachta) is usually 33% (2022), however there are some exceptions in the form of thresholds. The threshold is different for different groups of recipients of inheritance, depending on the relationship to decedent. In Group A there are children, or grandchildren (in case children are no longer alive) or parents, the threshold for zero tax rate is €335, 000. For Group B, which includes siblings, nieces and nephews and other linear ancestors, the threshold for tax free inheritance is €32,500 and for the last Group C of everyone else it is €16, 250. There are also some other exceptions.
- Italy: tassa di successione. Abolished in 2001 and reestablished in 2006. 1,000,000 exemption on a bequest to a spouse or child, and a maximum rate of 8%.
- Japan: sōzokuzei (相続税): paid as a national tax (between 10 and 55% after an exemption of ¥30 million + ¥6 million per heir is deducted from the estate) Japan has the highest inheritance tax rate in the world.
- South Korea: 상속세; 相續稅; sangsogse is paid as a national tax (between 10 and 50% taxes on inheritance when deceased, and gift taxes are also taxable on property and/or stock received by heir or child). After the death of Lee Kun-hee, then-chairman of the Samsung Group, in 2020, his heirs are facing a $10 billion inheritance tax bill (50% taxable amount).
- Latvia: mantojuma nodoklis: for 2 people if 1) they are not related: 7.5% and additional 7.5% if it is an estate; 2) if they are related and they lived together: 0.25% and additional 0.25% if estate; 3) if they are related and they did not live together: 0.5% and additional 0.5% if estate
- Luxembourg: There is an inheritance tax levied. The law distinguishes between two types of inheritance collected by two groups on heirs. First is the legal part "collected by the heir according to their capacity". This means what proportion should the heir receive given by the relationship to the decedent. Second is the extra-legal part "collected by the heirs as a result of a will, donation, etc.". This means something more than the legal part, given by some document. Generally, rates for extra-legal part are higher. For both parts rate is 0% between spouses and all rates depend on the relationship to the decedent.
- Netherlands: Successierecht. NB. as per 1 January 2010 Successierecht has been abolished for the erfbelasting regime, and is replaced with Erfbelasting with rates from 10% to 40% for brackets by amounts and separation. Sizeable exemptions are given based on separation. As an example, in 2019, these exemptions roughly equalled EUR 651k for partners, EUR 20k for children, EUR 2k for grandchildren and 40k for parents.
- Poland: inheritance and gift tax (state tax) applies to the estate and is regulated by the Act on Inheritance and Donation Tax (Ustawa o podatku od spadków i darowizn). Tax rates vary from 3% to 20% depending on the value of the inherited estate and relationship with between the deceased and the beneficiary. Close family members can benefit from the inheritance tax exemption provided that the tax office is notified about the inheritance acquisition within a statutory deadline.
- Slovenia: Tax rate is dependent on the amount of inheritance and also on the connection to the decedent. It ranges from 0 to 40%.
- Switzerland: No national inheritance tax. Some cantons impose estate taxes or inheritance taxes.
- Spain: Impuesto sobre Sucesiones. The amendment of Spanish law has been put into practice, in compliance with the European Court ruling, and on 31 December 2014, Order HAP/2488/2014, of 29 December, was published in the Official State Bulletin, which approves the Inheritance and Gift Tax self-assessment forms 650, 651, and establishes the place, form and term for its submission.
- Thailand: The government introduced inheritance tax starting on 1 January 2016. It only applies to estate of more than 100 million baht.
- Tunisia: There is so called registration fees applied also on inheritance. There are four rates of the fee depending on the kinship with the decedent. The lowest rate is 2,5% of the inherited goods value applying for ancestors and descendants, then 5% rate for siblings, 25% for uncles, aunts, nephews, nieces, and cousins and the highest 35% rate for everyone else, who inherits something.
- Turkey: Inheritance in Turkey is subject of Inheritance and gift tax with tax rates between 1% and 30%. This tax is payable over a period of three years. This can be done in biannual installments in May and November.
- Ukraine: In Ukraine, there is no inheritance tax, but amount inherited is taxed as ordinary income and therefore is subject to personal income tax at 0%, 5% or 18%.
- United Kingdom: see inheritance tax in United Kingdom (actually an estate tax)
- United States: see estate tax in the United States
- Vietnam: Income from inheritance is taxed as non-employment income in one category with income from gifts and winning prices (casino winning prices excluded) at 10% tax rate.
- Venezuela: Impuesto sobre Sucesiones y Donaciones [EGT] (The estate and gift tax) The estate and gift tax in Venezuela is imposed on inheritance as well as on gifts and other benefits. The tax rate is dependent on the kinship between the decedent and the one, who receives the inheritance.

Some jurisdictions formerly had estate or inheritance taxes, but have abolished them:

- Australia: Abolished the federal estate tax in 1979, and Australian State inheritance taxes (called death duties) were abolished between 1978 and 1982. In 1985, capital gains tax was introduced to tax capital gains on disposal of all assets. But as death is not treated as a disposal, it is only if and when assets are sold after death that capital gains tax is payable. A significant exemption from capital gains tax is the family home, which is exempt from tax if sold within 2 years of death.
- Austria: Abolished the Erbschaftssteuer in 2008. This tax had some of the features of the gift tax, which was abolished at the same time.
- Canada: abolished inheritance tax in 1972. However, capital gains are 50% taxable and added to all other income of the deceased on their final return.
- Cyprus: Estate duty was abolished for deaths occurring on or after 1 January 2000. Cyprus currently imposes no inheritance, gift or estate tax. Cross-border estates may nevertheless be subject to foreign inheritance or estate taxes according to residence, domicile, nationality or the location of assets.
- Czech Republic: daň dědická. Cancelled in 2013 and is not paid since 1 January 2014. All income from inheritance is now exempt from all taxes (including income tax). Before the reform there was a system of inheritance tax rates depending on the amount inherited and relationship to decedent.
- Estonia: There is no inheritance tax, however the income from inheritance is a subject of the personal income tax, which is at rate 20% and there are also some exempts from the taxation.
- Hong Kong: abolished estate duty in 2006 for all deaths occurring on or after 11 February 2006. (See Estate Duty Ordinance Cap.111)
- India: had an estate tax from 1953 to 1985
- Israel: abolished inheritance tax in 1981, but inherited assets are subject to a 20% to 45% capital gains tax upon their sale
- Kenya: abolished estate duty tax by virtue of the Estate Duty (Abolition) Act No. 10 of 1982.
- Malaysia: The tax was abolished in 1991 and there are still discussions about reintroducing going on.
- New Zealand abolished estate duty in 1992
- Norway: abolished inheritance tax in 2014
- Russia "abolished" "inheritance tax" in 2006, but have "fee" with rates of 0.3% up to 100,000 rubles, and 0.6% up to 1,000,000 rubles.
- Singapore: abolished estate tax in 2008, for deaths occurring on or after 15 February 2008.
- Sweden: a unanimous riksdag abolished the inheritance tax in 2004. A retroactive decision exempted deaths during late December 2004 from inheritance tax, due to the many Swedish casualties in the 2004 Indian Ocean earthquake.
- Portugal: the inheritance tax was abolished in 2004, however, there is still a tax called Stamp Duty, applied at a flat rate of 10% on the value of assets located in the country. Nonetheless, spouses, children, grandchildren, parents, and grandparents ("legitimate heirs"), since 2009, are exempt from this tax. Stamp Duty applies to real estate, registrable movable assets (such as cars or boats), and others, but does not apply to personal use items, such as clothes or jewelry, nor to life insurance or pensions from Social Security. It is important that all heirs, including those exempt, declare the assets received to the Tax Authority. The calculation of Stamp Duty, especially for real estate, is based on the property's Taxable Asset Value (VPT). Legitimate heirs are required to declare these assets, even though they are exempt from paying the tax.
- Slovak Republic: Daň z dedičstva. An inheritance tax in Slovak Republic was canceled in 2004, but there are still some exceptions when you are obligated to pay some tax.
- Hungary:The tax was abolished for close relatives (children, parents, spouse etc.), but there is still 18% general tax rate and 9% rate applying to residential property.
- Serbia: There are three degrees of succession and for each there is different tax rate. For the first degree (spouse, partner, children, parents) there is 0% tax rate, for the second 1,5% and for the third 2.5%.
- Bahamas

Some jurisdictions have never levied any form of tax in the event of death:

- Cayman Islands
- Jersey
- Jordan
- Guernsey

=== United Kingdom ===
Inheritance tax was introduced with effect from 18 March 1986. Succession duty, in the English fiscal system, is "a tax placed on the gratuitous acquisition of property which passes on the death of any person, by means of a transfer from one person (called the predecessor) to another person (called the successor)". In order properly to understand the present state of the English law it is necessary to describe briefly the state of affairs prior to the Finance Act 1894 (57 & 58 Vict. c. 30), an act which effected a considerable change in the duties payable and in the mode of assessment of those duties.

The Succession Duty Act 1853 (16 & 17 Vict. c. 51) was the principal act that first imposed a succession duty in England. By that act a duty varying from 1% to 10% according to the degree of consanguinity between the predecessor and successor was imposed upon every succession which was defined as "every past or future disposition of property by reason whereof any person has or shall become beneficially entitled to any property, or the income thereof, upon the death of any person dying after the time appointed for the commencement of this act, either immediately or after any interval, either certainly or contingently, and either originally or by way of substitutive limitation and every devolution by law of any beneficial interest in property, or the income thereof, upon the death of any person dying after the time appointed for the commencement of this act to any other person in possession or expectancy". The property which is liable to pay the duty is in realty or leasehold estate in the UK and personalty—not subject to legacy duty—which the beneficiary claims by virtue of English, Scottish, or Irish law. Personalty in England bequeathed by a person domiciled abroad is not subject to succession duty. Successions of a husband or a wife, successions where the principal value is under £100, and individual successions under £20, are exempt from duty. Leasehold property and personalty directed to be converted into real estate are liable to succession, not to legacy duty.

Special provision is made for the collection of duty in the cases of joint tenants and where the successor is also the predecessor. The duty is a first charge on property, but if the property be parted with before the duty is paid the liability of the successor is transferred to the alienee. It is, therefore, usual in requisitions on title before conveyance, to demand for the protection of the purchaser the production of receipts for succession duty, as such receipts are an effectual protection notwithstanding any suppression or misstatement in the account on the footing of which the duty was assessed or any insufficiency of such assessment. The duty is by this act directed to be assessed as follows: on personal property, if the successor takes a limited estate, the duty is assessed on the principal value of the annuity or yearly income estimated according to the period during which he is entitled to receive the annuity or yearly income, and the duty is payable in four yearly installments free from interest. If the successor takes absolutely he pays in a lump-sum duty on the principal value. On real property the duty is payable in eight half-yearly installments without interest on the capital value of an annuity equal to the annual value of the property. Various minor changes were made. The Customs and Inland Revenue Act 1881 (44 & 45 Vict. c. 12) exempted personal estates under £300. The Customs and Inland Revenue Act 1888 (51 & 52 Vict. c. 8) charged an additional 1/2% on successions already paying 1% and an additional 1 1/2% on successions paying more than 1%. By the Customs and Inland Revenue Act 1889 (52 & 53 Vict. c. 7), an additional duty of 1% called an estate duty was payable on successions over £10,000.

The Finance Acts 1894 and 1909 effected large changes in the duties payable on death. As regards the succession duties they enacted that payment of the estate duties thereby created should include payment of the additional duties mentioned above. Estates under £1,000 (£2,000 in the case of widow or child of deceased) are exempted from payment of any succession duties. The succession duty payable under the Succession Duty Act 1853 (16 & 17 Vict. c. 51) was in all cases to be calculated according to the principal value of the property, i.e., its selling value, and though still payable by installments interest at 3% is chargeable. The additional succession duties are still payable in cases where the estate duty is not charged, but such cases are of small importance and in practice are not as a rule charged.

=== United States ===
The United States imposed a succession duty by the War Revenue Act of 1898 on all legacies or distributive shares of personal property exceeding $10,000 (equivalent to $387,000 in 2025). This was a tax on the privilege of succession, and devises and land distributions of land were unaffected. The duty ran from 75 cents on the $100 to $5 on the $100, if the legacy or share in question did not exceed $25,000. On those over that value, the rate was multiplied 1.5 times on estates up to $100,000, twofold on those from $100,000 to $500,000, 2.5 times on those from $500,000 to a $1 million, and threefold for those exceeding a million. This statute was upheld as constitutional by the U.S. Supreme Court.

Many of the states also impose succession duties, or transfer taxes; generally, however, on collateral and remote successions; sometimes progressive, according to the amount of the succession. The state duties generally touch real estate successions as well as those to personal property. If a citizen of state A owns registered bonds of a corporation chartered by state B, which he has put for safe keeping in a deposit vault in state C, his estate may thus have to pay four succession taxes, one to state A, to which he belongs and which, by legal fiction, is the seat of all his personal property; one to state B, for permitting the transfer of the bonds to the legatees on the books of the corporation; one to state C, for allowing them to be removed from the deposit vault for that purpose; and one to the United States.

The different U.S. states all have other regulations regarding inheritance tax:

- Louisiana: abolished inheritance tax in 2008, for deaths occurring on or after 1 July 2004
- New Hampshire: abolished state inheritance tax in 2003; abolished surcharge on federal estate tax in 2005
- Utah: abolished inheritance tax in 2005
- Kentucky: close relatives are exempt from inheritance tax

Some U.S. states impose inheritance or estate taxes (see inheritance tax at the state level):

- Indiana: abolished the state inheritance on 31 December 2012
- Iowa: Inheritance is exempt if passed to a surviving spouse, parents, or grandparents, or to children, grandchildren, or other "lineal" descendants. Other recipients are subject to inheritance tax, with rates varying depending on the relationship of the recipient to the deceased.
- Maryland
- Nebraska
- New Jersey: New Jersey law puts inheritors into different groups, based on their family relationship to the deceased person:
  - Class A beneficiaries are exempt from the inheritance tax. It includes the deceased person's spouse, domestic partner, or civil union partner parent, grandparent, child (biological, adopted, or mutually acknowledged), stepchild (but not stepgrandchild or great-stepgrandchild), grandchild or other lineal descendant of a child
  - Class B was deleted when New Jersey law changed
  - Class C includes the deceased person's: brother or sister, spouse or civil union partner of the deceased person's child, surviving spouse or civil union partner of the deceased person's child. The first $25,000 inherited by someone in Class C is not taxed. On amounts exceeding $25,000, the tax rates are: 11% on the next $1,075,000, 13% on the next $300,000, 14% on the next $300,000, and 16% for anything over $1,700,000
  - Class D includes everyone else. There is no special exemption amount, and the applicable tax rates are: 15% on the first $700,000, and 16% on anything over $700,000
  - Class E includes the State of New Jersey or any of its political subdivisions for public or charitable purposes, an educational institution, church, hospital, orphan asylum, public library, and other nonprofits. These beneficiaries are exempt from inheritance tax.
- Pennsylvania: Inheritance tax is a flat tax on the value of the decedent's taxable estate as of the date of death, less allowable funeral and administrative expenses and debts of the decedent. Pennsylvania does not allow the six-month-after-date-of-death alternate valuation method that is available at the federal level. Transfers to spouses are exempt; transfers to grandparents, parents, or lineal descendants are taxed at 4.5%. Transfers to siblings are taxed at 12%. Transfers to any other persons are taxed at 15%. Some assets are exempted, including life insurance proceeds. The inheritance tax is imposed on both residents and nonresidents who owned real estate and tangible personal property in Pennsylvania at the time of their death. The Pennsylvania Inheritance Tax Return (Form Rev-1500) must be filed within nine months of the date of death.

=== Spain ===
Impuesto de sucesiones, in Spain, is the inheritance tax "that you must pay for the transference of goods due to the decease of a person. When a person dies in Spain, the set of goods will pass to their successors (heirs or legatees), and is for this acquisition of goods, rights, and obligations for which this tax must be paid". In Spain, the tax is regulated in Law 29/1987, of 18 December, on Inheritance and Donation Tax by Royal Decree 1629/1991, of 8 November, which approves the Tax Regulation on Inheritance and Donations.

It is a progressive tax, from 7.65% to 34% not including bonuses or reductions. However, rebates or reductions are common in most of the autonomous communities, with several of them reducing the tax rate to 1%, sometimes even to 0% if the tax base does not exceed a certain minimum. The applicable rate also depends on the proximity of the recipient or heir, being lower the greater its proximity to the deceased or donor (descendants, spouse...). It is usually summarized with the donation tax, as many parents transfer their goods inter vivos to their heirs.

From this tax, the Spanish state gets 2,360,932,000 euros (2019) which is a 17.3% of the total recollected by the autonomous communities.

This tax can be partially deduced according to the blood proximity of the person who will inherit the goods. The amount to deduce vary considerably depending on the autonomous community, and the reduction on the amount to pay has a descendant character, according to the membership group:

- Group I: Descendants, regardless of whether they are adopted or not, under 21 years.
- Group II: Descendants and adopted over 21 years and spouses.
- Group III: Siblings, uncles, and nephews.
- Group IV: Other people not included in the other groups. Cousins or not directly related people.

History of the tax

There's a consensus that this tax is a direct heir of the vicesima hereditatium, created during the reign of emperor Augustus, taxing heirlooms and legacies. In Rome this tax was considered a donation and it depended on if the subject who passes their goods to their heir was alive (inter vivos) or deceased (mortis causa). This tax disappeared during the Middle Ages and was again restored temporally with Charles the IV in 1798, and finally consolidated in 1829 with two rates depending on consanguinity 2% for spouses and 12% for the intestate until IV grade.

This tax will be oscillating for almost two centuries between 1 and 15% depending on the proximity group until 11 June 1964, where acquisitions mortis causa will be drastically increased compared to the previous centuries.

- On spouses and legitimate descendants (offspring), we will see tax rates between 3% and 21%.
- On legitimate ascendants (parents) we will see tax rates between 5% and 26%.
- On descendants and ascendants by affinity from 23% until 55%.
- On collaterals of second degree (Brothers, grandparents, or grandsons) we see the tax rates ranging between 28% and 58%.
- For collaterals of third degree (great-grandparents, great-grandchildren, uncles and nephews) the tax will be between 40 and 69%.
- And the highest rates to non-directly related people will range between 58% and 84%.

It will then be eliminated temporarily in 1977 and restored in 1987 which will prevail until now. Here the reductions that you can make on the payment are specified according to the 4 Groups:

- Group I: 15,956.87 euros + 3,990.72 euros for each year under 21. This quantity can not exceed the 47,858,59 euros.
- Group II: 15,956.87
- Group III: 7,993.46
- Group IV: There will be no place for reduction.

It is also presented a reduction of 47,858.59 euros for people who present a legal condition of handicapped over 35%. This deduction can increase up to 150,253.03 in handicaps over 65%.

Decentralization on the Spanish autonomous communities

You can calculate the tax you must pay following the state law. However, in Spain the calculus of the amount you pay depends on the specific autonomous community where you have your tax residence. In this scenario you must pay a percentage of the amount you inherit plus a certain quantity according to the total quantity you inherit.

Autonomous Communities Inheritance Tax
Autonomous Community	Amount collected with the succession and donation tax in 2019 (in €)	Maximum amount to pay (2022)
Andalusia	261,395,000	From 800,000: 26% + 171,620
Aragón	104,468,000	From 797,555: 34% + 199,291
Asturias	68,254,000	From 800,000: 36.50% + 205,920
Balearic Islands	110,570,000	From 800,000: 34% + 199,291
Canary Islands	26,518,000	From 797,555: 34% + 199,291
Cantabria	33,619,000	From 797,555: 34% + 199,291
Castile and León	188,467,000	From 797,555: 34% + 199,291
Castile La-Mancha	70,552,000	From 797,555: 34% + 199,291
Catalonia	559,825,000	From 800,000: 32% + 153,000
Extremadura	28,604,000	From 797,555: 34% + 199,291
Galicia	131,265,000	From 1,600,000: 18% + 198,000
Madrid	455,409,000	From 797,555: 34% + 199,291
Rioja	39,653,000	From 797,555: 34% + 199,291
Valencia	265,669,000	From 797,555: 34% + 199,291

The only Autonomous community excluded are Navarra and the Basque Country because they have their own tax system, and they work independently from the other communities or the central state.

This tax is deducible in many ways related to the consanguinity of the person who inherits, to the handicap level, the number of properties, usage of this properties, possession of enterprises, condition of victim of gender violence or terrorism. There are a lot of causes that can reduce notably your amount to pay. Moreover, this amount and reductions vary enormously according to the Autonomous Community you reside. For example, in Galicia, direct relatives of the deceased person will be exempted to pay the inheritance tax until the amount to inherit doesn't arrive the million euros. While in Asturias if you inherit a 700,000 property, the person will pay around a 20% of the amount depending on the variables.

=== Historical ===
==== Ancient Rome ====
No inheritance tax was recorded for the Roman Republic, despite abundant evidence for testamentary law. The vicesima hereditatium ("twentieth of inheritance") was levied by Rome's first emperor, Augustus, in the last decade of his reign. The 5% tax applied only to inheritances received through a will, and close relatives were exempt from paying it, including the deceased's grandparents, parents, children, grandchildren, and siblings. The question of whether a spouse was exempt was complicated—from the late Republic on, husbands and wives kept their own property scrupulously separate, since a Roman woman remained part of her birth family and not under the legal control of her husband. Roman social values on marital devotion probably exempted a spouse. Estates below a certain value were also exempt from the tax, according to one source, but other evidence indicates that this was only the case in the early years of Trajan's reign.

Tax revenues went into a fund to pay military retirement benefits (aerarium militare), along with those from a new sales tax (centesima rerum venalium), a 1% tax on goods sold at auction. The inheritance tax is extensively documented in sources pertaining to Roman law, inscriptions, and papyri. It was one of three major indirect taxes levied on Roman citizens in the provinces of the Empire.

== See also ==
- Estate planning
- Feudal relief
- Generation-skipping transfer tax
- Heriot
- Property tax
- Tax avoidance
- Windfall tax
