= Profits tax =

- Traditional Chinese: 利得稅
Transcriptions
Yue: Cantonese
- Yale Romanization: Leih dāk seui
- Jyutping: Lei6 dak1 soei3

In Hong Kong, profits tax is an income tax chargeable to business carried on in Hong Kong. Applying the territorial taxation concept, only profits sourced in Hong Kong are taxable in general. Capital gains are not taxable in Hong Kong, although it is always arguable whether an income is capital in nature.

The persons chargeable to profits tax includes corporations, partnerships, trustees, and sole proprietors.

== Chargeable scope ==
As a general rule, Hong Kong profits tax is levied on any persons who carries on a trade, profession or business in Hong Kong and assessable profits arising in or derived from Hong Kong for a year of assessment. The profits tax rate applied is 15% for individuals and 16.5% for corporations (a.k.a. the standard rate) on their net assessable profits for the year of assessment 2014/15.

== Source of profits ==
To argue whether profits arising in or derived from Hong Kong, case law judgments are often referred. The fundamental source rule was laid down by the landmark case The Commissioner of Inland Revenue ("CIR") v. Hang Seng Bank Ltd Co. (1991) 1 AC 306. Lord Bridge of Harwich of Privy Council held that the source of profits is a question of fact depending on the nature of transaction and stated the broad guiding principle in determining the source is that

One looks to see what the taxpayer has done to earn the profit in question and where he has earned it.

The statement is widely retrieved in the context of Taxation in Hong Kong and other jurisdictions and reconfirmed in subsequent cases, such as HK-TVB International Limited v. CIR (1992) 2 AC 397. However, while applying the broad guiding principle, it should not be distracted by the antecedent and incidental matters.

To reduce the complexity in determining the source of profits, the Inland Revenue Department of Hong Kong ("IRD") issued Departmental Interpretation and Practice Note No. 21 - Locality of profits ("DIPN no. 21") to provides potential taxpayers a guideline on the source of income. Following the guideline in DIPN no, 21, the taxpayers may first determine what kinds of profits do their business earn and make reference to the IRD's views in respect of the particular type of profits.

Types of Profits	Applicable Tests	Explanation
Trading profit	Operation test	Both sales and purchases contracts are effected in Hong Kong, fully taxable; Either sales or purchases contract are effected in Hong Kong, presumably fully taxable, subject to totality of fact analysis; Both sales and purchases contracts are effected outside Hong Kong, fully non-taxable; No apportionment of Hong Kong sourced profits and offshore profits is allowed.
Manufacturing profit	Operation test	Manufacturing operation is done in Hong Kong, fully taxable. For manufacturing operation done by Hong Kong Company in China, depends on whether the manufacturing process is: Contract processing; or; Import processing
Rental Income / Sales of immovable properties	Situs test	Determined by the location of properties
Service Income	Activity test	Determined by the location where services are performed

== Tax computation ==
The formula is:

HK profits tax payable = Net assessable profit × Profits tax standard rate

Net assessable profit = Assessable profit − Loss brought forward (if any) + Loss transferred from partnership (if any)

Assessable profit = Profit or (Loss) per financial account + (Disallowable expenses charged in account − Non-taxable income credited in account) − Depreciation allowances − Approved charitable donations

=== Approved charitable donations ===
The Approved charitable donations are limited to 35% (10% for years of assessment up to and including 2002/03; and 25% for years of assessment 2003/04 to 2007/08) of the adjusted assessable profits before deduction of donations, per section 16D of the IRO. Such aggregate must not be less than $100.

=== Section 14 ===
- A person carries on a trade, a profession or a business in Hong Kong
- There are profits arising in or derived from (trade, profession, business). Profit is not from the sales of capital assets
- The profits must be arising in or derived from Hong Kong
  - Contract effected test
  - Operation test
  - Provision of credit test
  - Development test or registration test

=== Badges of Trade ===
Any trade may be subject to profit tax unless one can provide reasonable evidence to prove that there is not any revenue profit. In Hong Kong, capital profit is not subject to tax.

In order to prove the nature of a trade, the badges of trade are to be considered:

1. the taxpayer's intention of profit (one acquisition of the commodity)
2. Subject Matter of the commodity disposal (If enjoyment can be assume on original acquisition, e.g. rental)
3. the length of ownership,
4. frequency of similar transactions,
5. reason for disposal,
6. supplementary work and so on.

== Basis period and year of assessment ==
The year of assessment of each year starts from 1 April and ends on 31 March in the next year. For example, the year of assessment for 1 April 2014 to 31 March 2015 is "Year of Assessment 2014/15". However, no adjustment is required to align the financial information with the end-date of year of assessment. On the contrary, IRD accepts the profits assessed in accordance with the accounting year-end date. In the context of tax law, this is also referred as basis period.

IRD Convention on "basis period"
Reporting period	Year of assessment	"Code"
1 January 2014 to 31 December 2014	Year of assessment 2014/15	"D Code"
1 April 2014 to 31 March 2015	Year of assessment 2014/15	"M Code"
1 July 2014 to 30 June 2015	Year of assessment 2015/16	"N Code"

== Tax depreciation ==
Purchases of industrial building, commercial building and plant and machinery are not deductible because they are capital in nature. Yet, capital expenditure may be deductible if they are categorised into following:

1. Capital expenditure on plant and machinery for research and development;
2. Capital expenditure on renovation or refurbishment on buildings other than domestic ones;
3. Capital expenditure on prescribed fixed assets (excluding lease or hire-purchase);
4. Capital expenditure on environmental protection facilities (excluding lease or hire-purchase).

If the capital expenditure is not deductible at any of the above provisions, the following depreciation allowances may be granted as an alternative deduction.

=== Industrial building and commercial building allowance ===
As derived from its name, the industrial building allowance is only available for buildings used, generally, for the purpose of manufacturing of goods and products. Buildings which are used to carry out other businesses may be qualified for commercial building allowance.

Industrial building allowance is more beneficial to the taxpayer because at the year of purchase, 20% of "initial allowance" on the capital expenditure can be deducted. Such benefit is not available for commercial buildings. For every year, 4% of the capital expenditure can be deducted as "annual allowance", until 25 years after its first use.

On the contrary, the amount which the proceeds received at the time of sales over the allowance claimed will be taxable as "balancing charge".

Summary - Depreciation allowance on buildings
Types	Industrial building allowance	Commercial building allowance
Initial allowance	20% on capital expenditure	Not available
Annual allowance	4% on capital expenditure	4% on capital expenditure

=== Depreciation Allowance on Plant and Machinery ===
Types of plant and machinery that are tax-depreciable and their respective rates (for annual allowance only, see below) are set out in a prescribed schedule. The definition of plant and machinery does not include any implement, utensil and article. Instead, they can be fully deductible for profits tax purpose on replacement basis (i.e. the initial purchase of which is not deductible)

For assets purchased during that year of assessment, an initial allowance of 60% will be granted. Thereafter, the assets sharing the same rates of annual allowance are transferred into a pool, classified by the prescribed schedule in the Rule 2 and annual allowance of either 10%, 20% or 30% will be granted for the entire pooled assets. For example, a motor vehicle, which is 30% pooled, can be first granted a 60% initial allowance and 30% of annual allowance on the remaining 40% asset value. Therefore, 72% (i.e. 60% + 30% x 40% = 72%) of the value of motor vehicle can be deducted from tax in the year of purchase.

== Tax loss ==
Tax losses can be carried forward to set off the profits in the future years until fully absorbed but not backward. Group loss relief is not available in the taxation in Hong Kong.

Taxpayer bears no rights to object a loss determined by IRD because loss is not an assessment in accordance to the definition of Ordinance. Until the time when profits are assessed which affects the tax loss (e.g. offsetting of previous tax loss), the taxpayer may apply for an objection to the CIR. It also implies that a statement of loss, which grants no objection option to the taxpayer, has a different status with the notice of assessment.

An assessment cannot be re-opened after being final and conclusive after 6 years (or 10 years in the case of willful tax evasion). On the contrary, a case of tax loss, even agreed by the CIR in previous year, can be re-opened at any time in the future since it is technically not an assessment.

== See also ==
- Inland Revenue Department (Hong Kong)
- Section 5 of the IRO - Property tax
- Section 8 of the IRO - Salaries tax

== Reference links ==
- Section 14 of the IRO
- HK Inland Revenue Department: Questions and Answers
- A Guide by Law&Trust about corporate (profit) taxation in Hong Kong
- Different profit tax standard rates apply to corporation and unincorporated business
