= Goepfert case =

Commissioner of Inland Revenue v George Andrew Goepfert, also known as the Goepfert case, is a leading Hong Kong tax case, affecting jurisprudence relating to the territory's salaries tax.

== Background ==
Goepfert was a US citizen employed by Exxon Corporation, seconded to its subsidiary operating out of Hong Kong. At all times, he was paid by Exxon in US currency, he reported directly to Exxon, the subsidiary's role was strictly secretarial, and his services were for the benefit of other affiliated companies outside Hong Kong.

The Commissioner of Inland Revenue, for the period of twelve months ended 31 March 1982, assessed Goepfert for liability for salaries tax. During that period he had rendered 41 days of his services outside Hong Kong and, apart from some overseas leave, had rendered the remainder of his services in Hong Kong. On appeal, the Board of Revenue, applying a "totality of facts" approach, ruled that Goepfert was liable for tax only for the salary earned during that part of the year in which he was in Hong Kong.

The Commissioner appealed the Board's ruling to the Hong Kong Court of First Instance.

== Court of First Instance ==
The Board's ruling was upheld. In so doing, the Court ruled that, as a matter of statutory interpretation, liability for salaries tax arises from two separate sources:

- employment income and pensions arising or derived from Hong Kong, and
- income (subject to certain exceptions) derived from services rendered in Hong Kong.

== Impact ==
Goepfert points out that the following factors must be taken into account to determine where the source of income arises for an employment (whether inside or outside the territory):

1. where the contract of employment was negotiated, entered into and is enforceable;
2. where the employer is resident; and
3. where the employee's remuneration is paid to him.

The Hong Kong Inland Revenue Department has issued guidance relating to its interpretation of the case.
