= Inland Revenue Ordinance =

Legislation of Hong Kong

Legislative Council of Hong Kong
- Long title: An Ordinance to impose a tax on property, earnings and profits.
- Citation: Cap. 112
- Enacted by: Legislative Council of Hong Kong

Legislative history
- Introduced by: Acting Financial Secretary C. G. S. Follows
- First reading: 24 April 1947
- Second reading: 1 May 1947
- Third reading: 1 May 1947
- Status: Current legislation

Inland Revenue Ordinance
- Traditional Chinese: 稅務條例
- Simplified Chinese: 税务条例
Transcriptions
Standard Mandarin
- Hanyu Pinyin: Shuìwù Tiáolì
Yue: Cantonese
- Yale Romanization: Seui mouh tìuh laih
- Jyutping: Seoi3 mou6 tiu4 lai6

The Inland Revenue Ordinance is one of Hong Kong's Ordinances. It regulates the inland revenue of Hong Kong.

As enacted in 1947, it did not tax all income, but rather "profits, salaries, rents and interest;" 99% of residents were exempt and the maximum rate was 10%.

== Most commonly used sections ==
=== Interpretation ===
IRO Section.2 Interpretation of some terms using in the ordinance.

=== Property tax ===
IRO Section.5 Charge of property tax

IRO Section.5B Ascertainment of assessable value

IRO Section.7C Rental Bad debts (irrecoverable & recovered)

=== Salaries tax ===
IRO Section.8 Charge of salaries tax

IRO Section.9 Definition of income from employment

=== Profit tax ===
IRD Rules 5 Charge of Profit tax in respect of non-resident

IRO Section.14 Charge of profits tax

IRO Section.15 Certain amounts deemed trading receipts

IRO Section.16 Ascertainment of chargeable profits

IRO Section.17 Deductions not allowed

=== Tax computation ===
IRO Section.18 Basis for computing profits

IRO Section.18F Adjustment of assessable profits

IRO Section.19 Treatment of losses

IRO Section.20 Liability of certain non-resident persons

IRO Section.20A Consignment Tax

IRO Section.22 Assessment of partnerships

IRO Section.24 Clubs, trade associations, etc.

IRO Section.25 Deduction of property tax from profits tax

- Any person's HK property tax payable can be set off by the same HK profit tax payable.

IRO Section.26A Exclusion of certain profits from tax

IRO Section.26B Concessionary deductions, general provisions

IRO Section.26C Approved charitable donations

IRO Section.26D Elderly residential care expenses

IRO Section.26E Home loan interest

IRO Section.26G Contributions to recognized retirement schemes

IRO Section.27 Allowances, general provisions

IRO Section.28 Basic allowance

IRO Section.29 Married person's allowance

IRO Section.30 Dependent parent allowance

IRO Section.31 Child allowance

IRO Section.32 Single parent allowance

IRO Section.34 Initial and annual allowances, industrial buildings and structures

IRO Section.35 Balancing allowances and charges, buildings and structures

IRO Section.37 Initial and annual allowances, machinery or plant

IRO Section.38 Balancing allowances and charges, machinery or plant

IRO Section.41 Election for personal assessment

=== Tax administration ===
IRO Section.51 Returns and information to be furnished

IRO Section.51C Business records to be kept

IRO Section.51D Rent records to be kept

IRO Section.56A Joint owners and co-owners

IRO Section.88 Exemption of charitable bodies

IRO Section.88A Advance rulings

== See also ==
- List of Hong Kong legislation
