= Salaries tax =

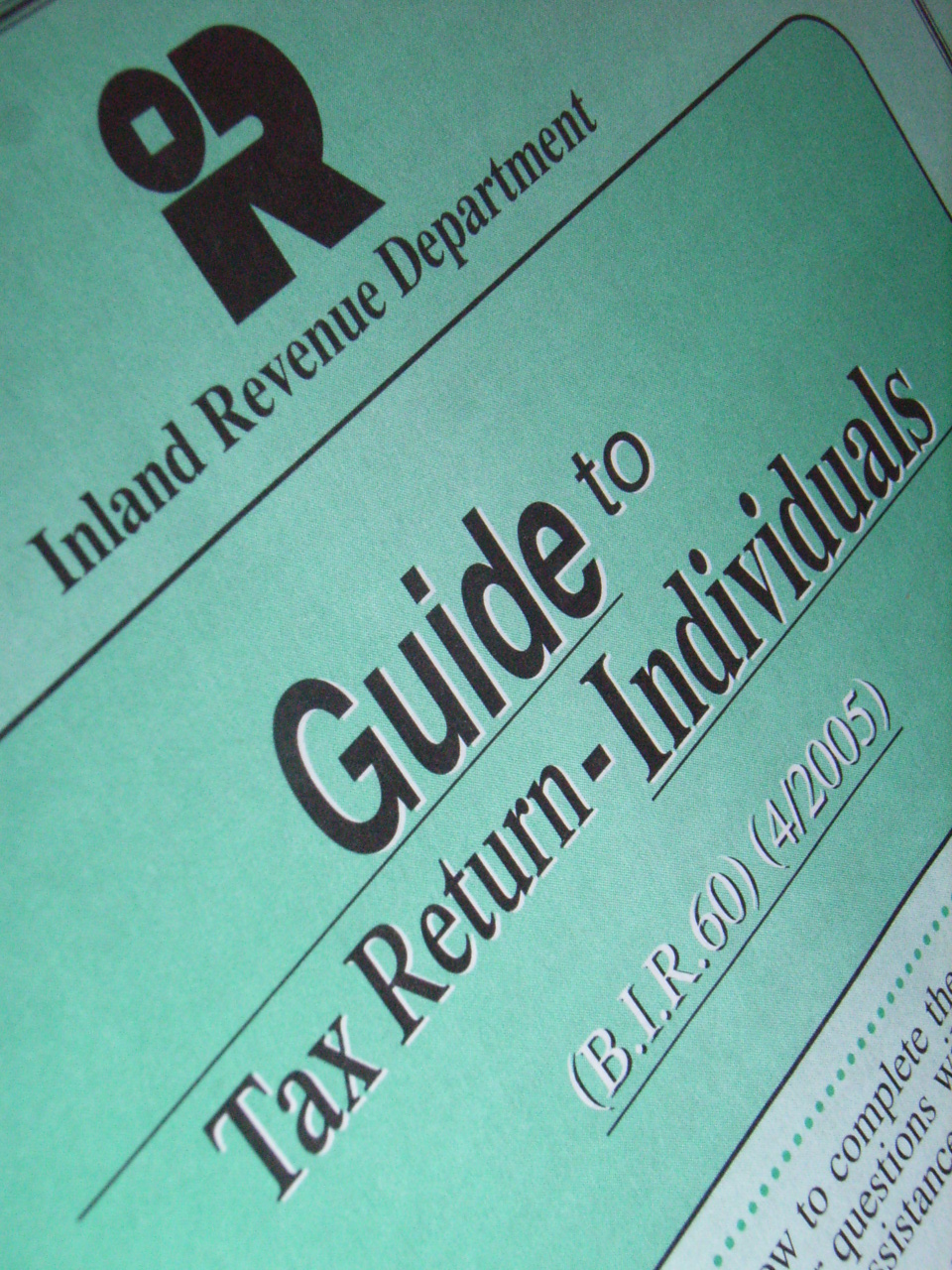
Salaries tax

Salaries tax is a type of income tax that is levied in Hong Kong, chargeable on income from any office, employment and pension for a year of assessment arising in or derived from the territory. For purposes of calculating liability, the period of assessment is from April 1 to March 31 of the following year.

Salaries tax is also charged on the unrealized capital gain of shares or options granted as part of an employee share scheme that are subject to a vesting period. Events that trigger tax are when the vesting period ends or when the employee leaves Hong Kong.

== Chargeable scope ==
Salaries tax is imposed on any office, employment and pension sourced in Hong Kong.

Office basically refers to the holding of office as a director or company secretary of the company resident in Hong Kong. Director's fee is fully taxable in Hong Kong irrespective where the director rendered services in Hong Kong or not.

Income derived from employment sourced in Hong Kong is taxable in Hong Kong. The source of employment is laid down in the Goepfert Rules and Departmental Interpretation and Practice Note No.10. However, those individuals who visit Hong Kong for periods not exceeding 60 days will be exempt from paying Salaries Tax. This provision is known as the "sixty-day rule". Employment sourced in Hong Kong will be fully chargeable to Salaries Tax whereas offshore employment will be chargeable on a "time-in-time-out" basis, the taxable income of which will be apportioned by reference to the days present in Hong Kong. Employment of a government civil servant is considered sourced in Hong Kong and therefore its income is always fully taxable in Hong Kong. The above-mentioned "sixty-day rule" shall not be applied to seamen and aircrew. Instead, they are bound by stricter conditions for exemption. To be exempt from liability to Salaries tax, they shall be present in Hong Kong not more than 60 days in the year and not more than 120 days in the two consecutive years, one of them being the current tax year.

A pension will be considered to be sourced in Hong Kong if it is managed and controlled in Hong Kong.

== Liability to tax ==
Employers must report details relating to new hires to the Inland Revenue Department within three months of the commencement of employment, which will enable to IRD to send out tax returns for the year of assessment. If the employee does not receive a return, he is required to send the department a notification of chargeability by 31 July following the year of assessment.

The tax is payable directly by the taxpayer, who is also obliged to remit provisional salaries tax by instalments based on the previous year's liability.

== Income subject to tax ==
Liability for salaries tax arises from two separate sources:

- employment income and pensions arising or derived from Hong Kong, and
- income derived from services rendered in Hong Kong (other than from visits totalling 60 days or less in any given year), except for:
  - income earned from services rendered wholly outside Hong Kong in connection with employment (except for those who work for the Government, or on board ships or aircraft), or
  - income earned in any territory on which tax similar to salaries tax has been paid.

Under Commissioner of Inland Revenue v George Andrew Goepfert, the following factors must be taken into account to determine where the source of income arises for an employment (whether inside or outside the territory):

1. where the contract of employment was negotiated, entered into and is enforceable;
2. where the employer is resident; and
3. where the employee's remuneration is paid to him.

Employment income is deemed to include the following:

1. wages, salaries and other compensation (other than severance payment or long service payment on termination of employment) whether from the employer or another person,
2. amounts received from a pension or provident fund connected with the employment,
3. amounts received from a recognized occupational retirement scheme,
4. the rental value of any place of residence provided rent-free (or any discount from the rental value from any rent paid) by the employer or an associated corporation, and
5. any gain realized by the exercise of, or by the assignment or release of, a stock option.

== Calculation of liability ==
Salaries tax is chargeable on the lower of:

- net chargeable income (total income less deductions and allowances)
- net total income (total income less deductions)

Deductions include expenses necessary for earning such income (such as professional membership dues for one association), expenses for self-education (subject to a ceiling of $80,000), charitable donations (subject to minimum and maximum limits), contributions to the Mandatory Provident Fund or other occupational retirement schemes, home loan interest (subject to a lifetime limit of 15 years) and elderly residential care expenses (subject to a ceiling of $76,000). Allowances are available for married persons, single parents and various dependents.

Rates applicable to salaries tax (2018/19)
Net chargeable income	Progressive rate	Net total income at standard rate
on the first $50,000	2%	15%
on the next $50,000	6%	15%
on the next $50,000	10%	15%
on the next $50,000	14%	15%
on the remainder	17%	15%

Personal assessment is also available where a taxpayer is also subject to property tax and/or profit tax. Married couples may opt for joint assessment of their liability.

== See also ==
- Inland Revenue Department (Hong Kong)
- Tax treaty
- Share options
- Rental value
- Profit tax
