= Property tax =

Tax on property, particularly real estate

A property tax (whose rate is expressed as a percentage or per mille, also called millage) is an ad valorem tax on the value of a property. (Note: In the OECD classification scheme, tax on property includes "taxes on immovable property or net wealth, taxes on the change of ownership of property through inheritance or gift and taxes on financial and capital transactions" (see: "Tax on property". data.oecd.org.), but this article only covers taxes on realty.)

The tax is levied by the governing authority of the jurisdiction in which the property is located. This can be a national government, a federated state, a county or other geographical region, or a municipality. Multiple jurisdictions may tax the same property.

Often a property tax is levied on real estate. It may be imposed annually or at the time of a real estate transaction, such as in real estate transfer tax. This tax can be contrasted with a rent tax, which is based on rental income or imputed rent, and a land value tax, which is a levy on the value of land, excluding the value of buildings and other improvements.

Under a property tax system, the government requires or performs an appraisal of the monetary value of each property, and tax is assessed in proportion to that value.

== Type ==
The four broad types of property taxes are land, improvements to land (immovable man-made objects, such as buildings), personal property (movable man-made objects) and intangible property. Real property (also called real estate or realty) is the combination of land and improvements.

Forms of property tax vary across jurisdictions. Real property is often taxed based on its class. Classification is the grouping of properties based on similar use. Properties in different classes are taxed at different rates. Examples of property classes are residential, commercial, industrial and vacant real property. In Israel, for example, property tax rates are double for vacant apartments versus occupied apartments. France has a tax on vacant properties, which successfully reduced the vacancy rate.

A special assessment tax is sometimes confused with property tax. These are two distinct forms of taxation: one (ad valorem tax) relies upon the fair market value of the property. The other (special assessment) relies upon a special enhancement called a "benefit" for its justification.

The property tax rate is typically given as a percentage. It may be expressed as a per mil (amount of tax per thousand currency units of property value), which is also known as a millage rate or mill (one-thousandth of a currency unit). To calculate the property tax, the authority multiplies the assessed value by the mill rate and then divides by 1,000. For example, a property with an assessed value of $50,000 located in a municipality with a mill rate of 20 mills would have a property tax bill of $1,000 per year.

== History of property tax ==
Before the presence of a monetary system, taxes were mostly paid as a percentage of crops raised. Later, the property tax of ancient world, parts of medieval Europe and American colonies was rather based on the area of the property rather than on its value. Finally, the property's gross output (e.g. annual income) was used as the base of taxation.

=== Ancient times ===
The first ever tax records, dating from about six thousand years BCE, were in the form of soil tablets which were found in the city-state of Lagash (Now in the territory of current Iraq). The system was called bala (rotation). It was such that each month one particular area of the city was taxed, which made such arduous task less difficult. In Ancient Egypt, taxes were levied against the value of grain, cattle, oil, beer, and also land. By that time only one person out of 100 was literate. Some of these people were tax assessors. They kept records about the owners of land along with its size. They collected annual data by calculating cattle and checking the crop yields. If the taxpayer was not able to pay the tax, he was brought before the court. Tax assessors were highly respected people due to their ability and skills.

=== Medieval times ===
In England in the 11th century, the taxes on land were paid by peasants who rented that land from its owner. The more productive the land was the higher the rent was. During the 1070s, William the Conqueror established an early form of land taxation. It was common that cities kept records of the owner of the property. Each parcel was measured and estimated. Later, after 1215, King John was limited in his power to raise revenue, so from this point, taxes could be collected only with the permission of his barons. After 1290 normal people started paying this type of tax based on the location of the property (higher for those in cities and lower for rural residents) In 16th century, even the King's own land was also taxed. The King's power of taxation became even weaker right after 1689 when the new law was introduced, meaning that he could not tax without Parliament's permission.

=== The Thirteen Colonies ===
Arriving in the New World, the Pilgrims landed at Plymouth and started building their city in 1620. Pilgrims formed a pact to protect themselves and also set laws including taxation and assessments. All people were allocated equal proportion of land from which they had to pay tax.

In Boston, a property tax was implemented by Puritans for paying the expenses of church and religious education. Every person paid this property tax regardless of one's religion. This particular system lasted for more than one hundred years. The assessor of the tax was the sheriff. The system of evidence was similar to England (the assessors kept records of personal estate). The situation of the citizen was taken into account as far as the property tax was concerned – meaning that a widow with children was not only forgiven property tax but also was guaranteed to receive a certain amount of money monthly. On the other hand, people who destroyed public property had to pay the cost of repairs with property tax.

=== The United States ===
After the establishment of the United States in 1776, taxes were raised in most regions (mostly through property). Later, the central Government found out that this system did not work as far more was spent than received from this measure. At the end of the 18th century, there was a dispute between Alexander Hamilton and Thomas Jefferson. The camp of Hamilton was for raising taxes (mainly property tax) centrally in order to increase the capacity of budget (also power) of the Government. The camp of Jefferson was for raising revenue locally as it "sounded" more like a concept of democracy. Hamilton had a strong head for finance; he helped to establish the capitalist system that exists today. However, the financial strategy mentioned above (high property tax) was a disaster for him. Higher taxes (especially property) was finally established during the concerns whether the war with France would happen or not. National property tax was enacted by Congress apportioned by population. There were many protests until the tax was finally repealed. On the other hand, the trend of raising the local property tax continued as local governments were able to raise their revenue by this measure.

==== The 20th century ====
At the beginning of the 20th century, it was found out that the tax system in US could not equitably tax the complicated economy. Many reforms were implemented (trying to reduce reliance on property taxes). The most important one was concerned with new narrow personal property tax was established especially for homeowners and intangible assets. Many US presidents have tried to push for lower property tax and for the implementation of income tax. By the time of the Great Depression, the property tax collection rates dropped as people's income decreased steeply. The Governments mostly cut property tax and implemented sales taxes. After the Great Depression, many movements were formed for addressing claims on the Government with real tax reforms. Many of these reforms were approved and remain the current law.

==== Criticism ====
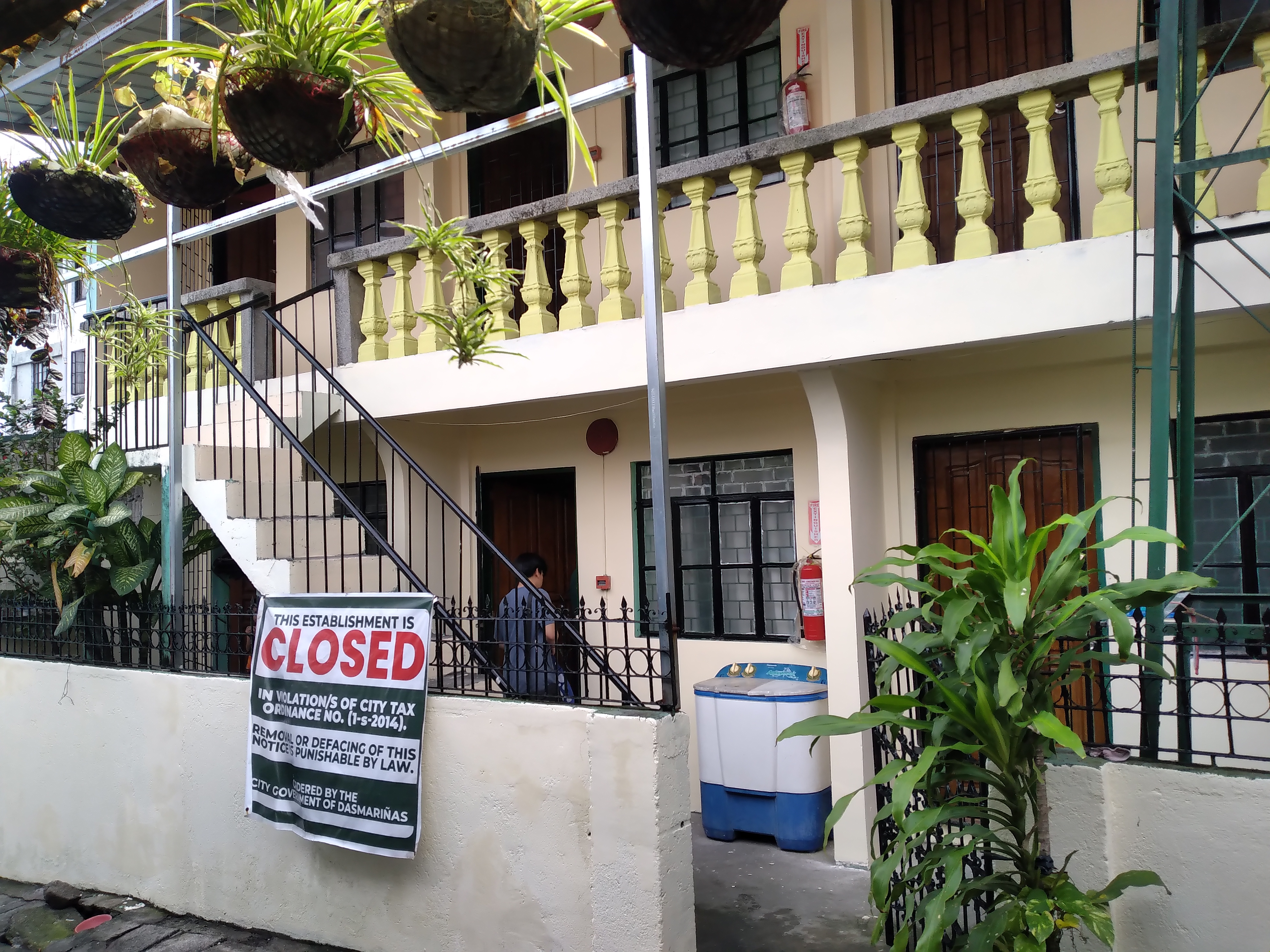
An apartment building closed for property tax arrears.

Critics of property taxes note that this type of tax demonstrates that so-called "property owners" are renters of their land and that the government is regarded as the final owner since the property owners can be evicted at any time for failure to pay this tax. For example, a resident of Southfield, Michigan, was evicted from her home for missing a $900 property tax payment. The town refused to accept her late payment and instead confiscated and sold her nearly $300,000 home. Critics note that instances like this are a fairly frequent occurrence and demonstrate a threat to property rights, due process, and the rule of law.

== Summary ==
Property tax system by country No property tax Tax on buildings only Tax on land only Area-based tax Value-based tax Area and location-based tax Separate value-based tax rates on land and buildings Value-based tax with capped reevaluation Area-based tax for land and value-based tax for buildings

Property tax systems by country.
Location	Type	Details
Angola	Value-based (buildings only)	
Anguilla	Value-based (buildings only)	
Austria	Value-based with frozen evaluation	Based on values of property in 1973
Belgium	Value-based with frozen evaluation	Based on values of property in 1975
Czech Republic	Area-based	
Democratic Republic of the Congo	Area-based	
Estonia	Land-value tax	
France	Value-based with frozen evaluation	Based on values of property in 1970
Germany	Value-based	Before 2025 based on values of property in 1964 (former West Germany) and 1935 (former East Germany)
Ghana	Value-based (buildings only)	
Israel	Area-based	
Jamaica	Land-value tax	
Kenya	Land-value tax	
Luxembourg	Value-based with frozen evaluation	Based on values of property in 1941
Macao	Land-value tax	
Papua New Guinea	Land-value tax	
Poland	Area-based	Fixed per square meter rates with different rates depending on the type of property
Sierra Leone	Value or area-based (buildings only)	
Slovakia	Area-based	
Tajikistan	Area-based	
Ukraine	Area-based	
United Kingdom	Value-based with frozen evaluation	Based on values of property in 1991

== By jurisdiction ==
General government revenue, in % of GDP, from property taxes. This rate alone determines 44% of the international variation in PPP GDP per capita.

Property classes, tax rates, assessment rules and valuations vary by jurisdiction.

=== Armenia ===
Comparatively, Armenia ranks low internationally in terms of property tax to GDP ratio. Currently, it is 0.2% compared to the 2% global average. Based on the new amendments in the tax code, from 2021, property taxes are calculated based on market value prices, separately for apartments and residential houses. The new amendment removed the previously existing non-taxable property threshold, putting a minimum of 0.05% property tax.

Real Estate Tax Rate on Residential Houses and Country Houses:

- Up to 7 mln AMD inclusive – 0.05%
- 7–23 mln AMD inclusive – 3.500 AMD + 0.1% of tax base amount exceeding 7 mln AMD
- 23–50 mln AMD inclusive – 19.500 AMD + 0.2% of tax base amount exceeding 23 mln AMD
- 50–85 mln AMD inclusive – 73.500 AMD + 0.4% of tax base amount exceeding 50 mln AMD
- 85–120 mln AMD inclusive – 213.500 AMD + 0.6% of tax base amount exceeding 85 mln AMD
- 120–200 mln AMD inclusive – 423.500 AMD + 1% of tax base amount exceeding 120 mln AMD
- More than 200 mln AMD – 1.223.500 AMD + 1.5% of tax base amount exceeding 200 mln AMD

Real Estate Tax Rate on Apartment building, Apartments and Non-Residential Areas:

- Up to 10 mln AMD inclusive – 0.05%
- 10–25 mln AMD inclusive – 5.000 AMD + 0.1% of tax base amount exceeding 10 mln AMD
- 25–47 mln AMD inclusive – 20.000 AMD + 0.2% of tax base amount exceeding 25 mln AMD
- 47–75 mln AMD inclusive – 64.000 AMD + 0.4% of tax base amount exceeding 47 mln AMD
- 75–100 mln AMD inclusive – 176.000 AMD + 0.6% of tax base amount exceeding 75 mln AMD
- 100–200 mln AMD inclusive – 326.000 AMD + 1% of tax base amount exceeding 100 mln AMD
- More than 200 mln AMD – 1.326.000 AMD + 1.5% of tax base amount exceeding 200 mln AMD

=== Australia ===
Australian property is taxed at both the state and council (local municipal) level. Taxes are payable by property owners – there is no property tax charged to renters.

A state tax commonly called "stamp duty" is assessed when property is purchased or transferred. It is typically around 5% of the purchase price, payable by the purchaser. Other transfer charges may also apply, including special fees for investors from overseas.

"Land tax" – also a state tax – is assessed every year on a property's value. Most Australians do not pay land tax, as most states provide a land tax exemption for the primary home or residence. Depending on the state, surcharge tax rates can apply to foreign owners.

"Council rates" is a municipal tax levied by local government. This is assessed each year on a property's value. Council rates are around $1300 per annum for an average Australian household.

=== Brazil ===
Brazil is a Federation Republic, and its federated entities (internal States and Municipalities), as well as the Federal government, levy property taxes. They are all declared in the Federal Constitution.

These are the current property taxes:

- Tax on Rural Territorial Property (Imposto Territorial Rural - ITR) – federal: levied upon real state property on rural areas;
- Tax on Urban Territorial Property (Imposto Predial e Territorial Urbano - IPTU) – municipal: levied upon real state property on urban areas;
- Tax on Motorized Vehicles Property (Imposto sobre Propriedades de Veículos Automotores - IPVA) – state: levied upon the property of cars, trucks, motorcycles, and the likes;
- Tax on Large Fortunes (Imposto sobre Grandes Fortunas) – federal: it is declared on the Federal Constitution, but there is still no regulation defining its incidence.

=== Canada ===
Many provinces levy property tax on real estate based upon land use and value. This is the major source of revenue for most municipal governments. While property tax levels vary across municipalities, a common property assessment or valuation criterion is laid out in provincial legislation. The trend is to use a market value standard for valuation purposes with varying revaluation cycles. Multiple provinces established an annual reassessment cycle where market activity warrants, while others have longer periods between valuation periods. There are two types of property tax: annual property tax and land transfer tax.

==== Annual property taxes ====
The annual property tax is usually a percentage of the taxable assessed value of the property. The taxable assessed value is commonly determined by the assessment service provider of the municipality. The annual property tax rate for any province contains at least two elements: the municipal rate and the education rate. The combination of municipal and education tax portions along with any base taxes or other special taxes determines the full amount of the tax.

- In Ontario, property tax was first introduced in 1849 with the Municipal Act (or Baldwin Act) as the act constituted a municipal structure with cities, towns, and villages along with the creation of property tax that municipalities must collect that would also support schools. The tax is calculated by multiplying the current year property-value assessed by the Municipal Property Assessment Corporation (MPAC) with the total tax rate. A study from 2019 suggested that Toronto, the capital of Ontario, had the lowest property tax in the province at that time.
- In British Columbia, the BC Assessment conducts an evaluation of properties all over British Columbia and submits assessed values for each of them yearly. BC Assessment maintains real property assessments in compliance with the Assessment Act which requires that properties be assessed as of 1 July each year. The final property tax amount is calculated by multiplying the municipal final property tax rate for the year by the BC Assessment value. Vancouver has the lowest property tax in Canada as a percentage of assessed value because while property values are extremely high, the city's budget has stayed relatively constant.
- In Alberta, property taxes have existed since 1905, when Alberta became a Province; up until 1995, all properties and land except for farmland including industrial and residential properties were assessed at market value but the adoption of the Municipal Government Act in 1995 brought along many changes to property assessments. Properties in Alberta are assessed currently every year by municipalities according to guidelines by the Ministry of Municipal Affairs and the Alberta Assessment and Property Tax Policy Unit. Property taxes in Alberta are primarily made up of two components: a municipal tax and a provincial education tax. The specific property tax rate for a certain year depends on the budget of the municipality and its total assessment base, and Education property tax rates are also set by municipalities.
- In Saskatchewan, properties are assessed by the assessment service provider of the municipality which is usually the Saskatchewan Assessment Management Agency (SAMA). A taxable rate established by the province will be applied to the full value which determines the taxable assessment. For the municipal portion of the tax, the municipal mill rate (1 mill = 0.001) will be multiplied by the total taxable assessment then multiplied by the mill rate factor for determining the amount. There is a set education mill rate established by the province for all municipalities, and no mill rate factor is applied to it. The combination of municipal and education tax portions along with any base taxes or other special taxes determines the full amount of the tax.
- In Manitoba, property value assessments are conducted by the provincial assessment services delivered through 10 district offices with the exception of Winnipeg, which has their assessment conducted by the City of Winnipeg only. Each class of property will have a different sized portion of their assessed value that is taxable. The property tax in Manitoba consists of four parts: a municipal rate, a provincial Education rate, a School Division rate, and additional taxes for local services as needed. Every year, the education tax is set by the provincial Minister of Education while the rest is set by the City Council; the rates are expressed in mills.
- In Québec, value assessments are conducted by the respective regional county municipality (municipalité régionale de comté) every three years. Regional county municipalities were established in 1979 to deal primarily with land use. In Québec, property tax is usually based on the assessed value of a property and the residential property tax rate. Properties are assessed using a market value-based approach. For residential properties, the sales of similar properties are compared to determine a valuation for the property. In unique circumstances, a cost approach is used where the cost of the property, if someone were to rebuild it, is given a valuation minus depreciation. For properties that are intended for generating income, an income approach is used to assess the market value. In this province, property taxes are used to pay for services such as the fire and police department, public transportation, as well as elementary and secondary education.

==== Land transfer tax ====
Land transfer tax is a provincial tax levied when purchasing a home or land in Canada. All provinces have a land transfer tax, except Alberta and Saskatchewan. In most provinces, the tax is calculated as a percentage of the purchase price. In Toronto there is an additional municipal tax.

Ontario, British Columbia, Prince Edward Island, Montreal, and the City of Toronto offer land transfer tax rebates for first-time homebuyers.

===== British Columbia =====
In British Columbia the property transfer tax is equal to one percent tax on the first $200,000 of the purchase price, two percent on the remaining amount up to $2million and three percent on the rest. An additional 15% tax that applies only to non-resident foreign home buyers in Greater Vancouver started on 2 August 2016. Later in 2018 this was raised to 20%. The definition of foreign buyer includes international students and temporary foreign workers. Anti-avoidance measures include fines of $100,000 for individuals and $200,000 for corporations.

====== First time home buyers program ======
The First Time Home Buyers Program is a program by the BC government that offers qualifying first-time homebuyers a reduction or elimination of the property transfer tax. It can be used in conjunction with the B.C. Home Owner Mortgage and Equity Partnership.

The First Time Home Buyers Tax Credit is also available in Ontario, which offers First Time Home Buyers a $750 tax rebate. In 2017, the Ontario Government also released the Land Transfer Tax Rebate, which allowed for up to $4,000 rebate – ensuring that first time home buyers of homes valued under $368,000 would not pay land transfer tax.

====== New home exemption ======
The Newly Built Home Exemption is a program that reduces or eliminates the property transfer tax on new homes. The amount is limited to $13,000 for qualifying individuals who must be either a Canadian citizen or a permanent resident. The property purchased must be located in British Columbia, have a fair market value of $750,000, be smaller than 1.25 acres and be used as a principle residence. It can be used in conjunction with the B.C. Home Owner Mortgage and Equity Partnership.

=== Chile ===
The land property tax, called "territorial tax" or "contribution", is an annual amount paid quarterly by the property's owner. It is determined as a percentage of the property's "fiscal value", which is calculated by the Internal Revenue Service, based on the property's land and built area, construction materials, age, and use. The fiscal value, which is usually much lower than the market value, may be disputed by the owner. The annual levy varies between 1 and 2% of this value, depending on the property's use (residential, agricultural or commercial). Residential properties valued below US$40K (as of 2013) are not taxed; those above that threshold are taxed only on the amount exceeding US$40K. Revenues go to the municipality administering the property's commune. All municipalities contribute a share of the revenue to a "common municipal fund" that is then redistributed back to municipalities according to a their needs (commune's poverty rate, etc.). Additionally, municipalities charge a quarterly trash collection tax, which is often paid together with the territorial tax (if applicable).

=== Egypt ===
The law imposes a tax on each property. Public buildings are excluded (such as government buildings), as are religious buildings (mosques and churches). Families owning private properties worth up to E£2 million ($41,700) are exempt. Commercial stores with an annual rent value over E£1,200 are not exempt.

=== France ===
In France, the property tax (taxe foncière) is a local tax payable by all owners of real estate located in France. This tax is used to finance the budget of local authorities. The property tax comprises three different taxes: the tax on built properties, the tax on unbuilt properties, and a tax on household waste removal.

Property tax on built properties

This is the most common tax in France. It is detailed in Article 1380 of the General Tax Code. Since it is a local tax, the property tax of built properties has a census role. The tax authorities count the new owners every year. Two conditions must be met to be subject to this tax: The property must be irremovable and must fall into the category of real buildings.

This tax therefore applies to the following:

- Installations intended to shelter people: house, apartment, loft, chalet, villa, etc.
- Parkings
- Industrial or commercial installations: hangar, workshop, premises etc.
- Works of art
- Telecommunications channels
- Boats used at a fixed point
- Soils of all types of buildings and land forming an essential and immediate dependency of these constructions

Property tax on non-built properties

This tax concerns land that is not used for residential purposes.

It applies to the following:

- Land and greenhouses assigned to an agricultural operation
- Bodies of water, marshes and salt marshes
- Quarries, mines and peatlands
- Soils of built properties, rural buildings, courtyards and outbuildings
- Golf courses, without constructions, commercially operated or not
- Private roads, gardens and parks, etc.
- Land occupied by railways

Responsible for property tax

The owner, not tenant, of the property must pay the tax. The owner liable for property tax can be an individual, company or legal entity (commercial company or real estate company). The tax is due each year from taxpayers who own property on 1 January of the tax year. If the property is sold during the year, the seller can ask for the tax to be shared with the buyer.

Specific situations:

- In the case of a dismemberment of the property right, it is the usufructuary who is liable for the property tax.
- In the event of joint ownership, the property tax is established in the name of all joint owners
- If a condominium real estate company is liable for property tax, then the taxation is established in the name of each partner in proportion to their share.

Calculation of property tax and payment

The calculation of the property tax is based on three components:

- The cadastral rental value: This value corresponds to the theoretical amount that could be applied if the property was rented.
- The revaluation coefficient: This coefficient is voted each year by the government.
- The tax rate voted by the local authorities: This rate is voted each year by the municipalities.

The amount of property tax is equal to the tax base x the tax rate voted by the municipality.

The tax base is equal to 50% of the cadastral rental value of the property (For non-built properties, this tax base is equal to 80%). To this base is then applied the revaluation coefficient. (It stood at 1.012 for 2020).

The payment of the property tax is usually made before mid-October. The tax notice is drawn up in the name of the owner who is the only person liable for the property tax. The precise deadline for paying it varies depending on the method of payment chosen.

Exemption from property tax

In certain situations the property tax allows exemptions. The conditions of this exemption may depend on the property or the situation of the owner.

- New housing is subject to a 2-year temporary exemption.
- New constructions occupied by low-rent housing are subject to a 15-year temporary exemption.
- Old dwellings that have undergone energy renovation work are subject to a 5-year temporary exemption.
- Owners over the age of 75 whose reference tax income is capped are exempt for life. (For 2019, the reference tax income must not exceed 11,098 euros for the first part of the family quotient)

Certain properties are permanently exempt:

- The properties of the State and of the various public authorities
- Public works established for the distribution of drinking water
- State-owned buildings used for worship
- Fixed assets intended for the production of electricity from photovoltaic sources

There are also exemptions for unbuilt properties.
For example, land sown, planted or replanted with wood can be 100% exempt for a period ranging from 10 to 50 years depending on the plantations.

In 1999, France introduced a tax on vacant properties. It reduced the vacancy rate by 13%.

Taxes on Secondary Residences and Unoccupied Dwellings

In addition to ordinary property tax, other related taxes may be paid on secondary residences or unoccupied dwellings.

The "taxe d'habitation sur les résidences secondaires" is a local tax payable by the owner, usufructuary, or long-term lessee of a (furnished) secondary residence. This tax is based on the cadastral rental value of the property and its annexes, and the local tax rate; it may be subject to increased taxation if it is located in a government-designated "zone tendue" (an area where the housing market is deemed tight).

The "taxe annuelle sur les logements vacants" (TLV) and the "taxe d'habitation sur les logements vacants" (THLV) are taxes payable by the owner of an unfurnished, unoccupied dwelling. The TLV is paid annually to the central government if the dwelling is located in a "zone tendue" and has been left unoccupied for at least one year. The THLV is payable to municipalities that have opted to implement the tax, and applies to dwellings left unoccupied for more than two years.

=== Germany ===
Real Property Tax

In Germany, the legal basis for the property tax is the so-called Grundsteuergesetz (GrStG), that is the property tax law, according to which real property is classified into the following two categories (§2 GrStG):

- Real property utilised for agriculture and forestry
- Constructible real property or real property with buildings.

The tax rate is dependent on the category the respective real property falls into. The tax burden is calculated by multiplying the value of the real property according to the official assessment code (Bewertungsgesetz) with the real property tax rate and with the applicable municipal multiplier. The real property property tax rate is set by the Federal state, in which the respective real property is located. It ranges from 0.26 to 1 percent. The municipal multiplier is set by each municipality.

Real Property Tax Revenue

The revenue of property taxes amounts to almost 15 billion euros annually and benefits the municipalities for whom the property tax is among the most important sources of income. This is because the property tax revenues are utilised on a municipal level to finance public facilities such as schools, libraries, daycare centers and local infrastructure projects.

Real Property Tax Reform

In 2018, the Federal Constitutional Court ruled that the system of property tax assessment is unconstitutional since it treated similar properties differently and thus resulted in a violation of Article 3 (equality before the law) of the Basic Law for the Federal Republic of Germany. So far, the calculation of property tax has been based on decades-old standard values. In the federal states of the former West Germany these standard values were last established in 1964, whereas the standard values of the former East Germany were last determined in 1935. Accordingly, these standard values do not reflect the development of the real properties´ market values. Therefore, the Federal Constitutional Court declared that the standard values lead to unequal tax treatment. Consequently, the German parliament had to enact a property tax reform, which entered into force in 2022. As a result, all property owners were obliged to submit a reassessment of their property values as of 1 January 2022 to the fiscal authorities by 31 January 2023. Property taxes calculated in accordance with these new values will be levied from 1 January 2025 onwards. In addition, the real property tax reform grants municipalities the right to set an increased rate of assessment on undeveloped, ready-to-build land from 2025 onwards for urban development reasons.

Real Property Tax Exemptions

According to the German property tax law (§3 GrSTG) certain legal entities are exempt from property taxation. These include entities from the public sector like federal, state, and municipal authorities, as well as public institutions and foundations under public law, if they use the property for public purposes only. An exemption from property taxation is also made for non-profit organisations, that pursue exclusively and directly charitable, religious, cultural, scientific, or educational purposes. Besides, churches and other religious communities are exempt from property taxation if the property is used exclusively for religious or charitable purposes.

Real Property Transfer Tax

The real property transfer tax (Grunderwerbssteuer) is imposed when a domestic property is sold or when the ownership is subject to change. The tax rate is set by the federal state in which the property is located. It ranges from 3.5 to 6.5 percent. It is a one-time payment which is levied on properties whose purchase price exceeds EUR 2.500 and is typically paid for by the buyer. The real property transfer tax is also levied if at least 95 percent interests in a partnership are transferred to new partners within five years or if at least 95 percent of the shares of a company, which owns a property, is transferred to a new shareholder.

=== Greece ===
Greece has a Municipal and a Government property tax. The municipal property tax (ΤΑΠ/ΔΤ/ΔΦ) is included in electricity bills and incorporates, among others, charges for street cleaning and lighting. The Government property tax (ENFIA) is a combination of the individual asset's tax based upon floor-area and a progressive real-estate wealth tax per individual which is based on the estimated net-worth of all properties and can reach 2%.

=== Hong Kong ===
In Hong Kong, the property tax is not an ad valorem tax; it is actually an income tax. The taxes that are levied on the value of real estates themselves are called rates and government rent instead.

According to HK Inland Revenue Ordinance IRO s5B, property owners must pay this tax only if they received a consideration such as rental income for the year of assessment. The property tax is computed on the net assessable value at the standard rate. The period of assessment is from 1 April to 31 March.

==== Net assessable value ====
The formula is:

Net assessable value = 80% of Assessable value.

HK property tax payable = Net assessment value X Property tax standard rate

Assessable value = Rental income + Premium + (Rental bad debt recovered — Irrecoverable rent) – Rates paid by owner.

=== India ===
Property taxes are levied by either state government or local civic bodies. Property tax or 'house tax' is a local tax on buildings, along with appurtenant land. It is imposed on the Possessor (not the custodian of property as per 1978, 44th amendment of the constitution). It resembles the US-type wealth tax and differs from the excise-type UK rate. The tax power is vested in the states and is delegated to local bodies, specifying the valuation method, rate band, and collection procedures. The tax base is the annual rental value (ARV) or area-based rating. Owner-occupied and other properties not producing rent are assessed on cost and then converted into ARV by applying a percentage of cost, usually four percent. Most big-city municipals have tax on vacant lands, and other smaller cities and rural areas don't have any property tax on vacant lands. In most cases, civic bodies have taxes exempted on all the buildings and lands used for: religious worship by the public; public burial & cremation; or charitable & educational purposes. Some agricultural or heritage lands are also exempt. Other than that, Central government properties are exempt. Instead, a "service charge" is permissible under executive order. Properties of foreign missions also enjoy tax exemption without requiring reciprocity. The tax is usually accompanied by service taxes, e.g., water tax, drainage tax, conservancy (sanitation) tax, lighting tax, all using the same tax base. The rate structure is flat on rural (panchayat) properties, but in the urban (municipal) areas it is mildly progressive with about 80% of assessments falling in the first two brackets.

Below are details of certain local civic bodies:

serial	cities	Municipal Body	Tax on Vacant Land	Tax Reference
1	Mumbai	Brihanmumbai Municipal Corporation (BMC)	Yes	ptaxportal.mcgm.gov.in
2	Delhi	Municipal Corporation of Delhi (MCD)	Yes	
3	Bangalore	Bruhat Bengaluru Mahanagara Palike (BBMP)	Yes	
4	Hyderabad	Greater Hyderabad Municipal Corporation (GHMC)	Yes	
5	Ahmedabad	Ahmedabad Municipal Corporation (AMC)		
6	Chennai	Greater Chennai Corporation (GCC)	Yes	
7	Kolkata	Kolkata Municipal Corporation (KMC)	Yes	
8	Surat	Surat Municipal Corporation		www.suratmunicipal.gov.in/Departments/PropertyTaxStructure
9	Pune	Pune Municipal Corporation	Only on Carpet Area of Vacant Land/property	
10	Jaipur	Jaipur Municipal Corporation		

=== Ireland ===
A Local Property Tax came into effect in the Republic of Ireland on 1 July 2013, and is collected by the Revenue Commissioners. The tax is on residential properties. The property owner is liable (though in the case of leases for longer than twenty years, the tenant is liable). The revenue funds the provision of services by local authorities. Such services include public parks, libraries, open spaces and leisure amenities, planning and development, fire and emergency services, maintenance, and street cleaning and lighting.

The tax is based upon market value, taxed via a system of market bands. As of 2021 the initial national central rate of the tax is 0.18% of a property's value up to €1 million. Properties valued over €1 million are assessed 0.25% on the excess. From 1 January 2015 local authorities can vary LPT rates at up to 15% below or above the national central rate.

In the case of properties valued over €1 million, no banding applies – 0.18% is charged on the first €1 million (€1,800) and 0.25% on the balance. The government estimates that 85% to 90% of all properties fall within the first five taxation bands.

=== Italy ===
In Italy property tax includes municipal property tax, transfer tax, and value-added tax (VAT).

- Immobiliare (Real Estate) Tax: The primary property tax in Italy is the Imposta Municipale Unica (IMU), commonly known as the municipal property tax. The tax is charged on the ownership of buildings, buildable areas and agriculturallands situated within the Italian territory. IMU is an annual tax levied on the cadastral income of the property, with rates varying based on the municipality. Typically, IMU rates range from 0.4% to 0.8%, and the tax is due by September 30 each year. There are two exceptions for IMU. First, the building used as a first house by the taxpayer. Second, according to the Law 208/2015, the agricultural land, cultivated, owned and run by farmers and professional agricultural entrepreneurs.
- Transfer Tax: The Imposta di Registro, or Registration Tax is applicable during property transactions and varies based on the property type, with rates ranging from 2% to 9%. This imposta di registro is necessary because all citizens are obliged to make an official record of all changes of deeds in a public register, in this case the Tax Agency Office (Ufficio dell'Agenzia delle Entrate).
- Value Added Tax (VAT): Buyers of new properties or those substantially renovated may be subject to Value Added Tax (VAT) at rates between 4% and 22%, depending on the property's type and location.

The total property tax amount paid in Italy depends on factors such as property value, location, and residency status.

Foreign nationals owning property in Italy should be aware of their tax obligations. While Italy does not impose specific property taxes based solely on foreign nationality, individuals must comply with reporting requirements for foreign assets and income under Italian tax laws. Failure to meet these obligations can lead to penalties.

Imposta sul valore degli immobili situati all'estero (LVIE) is a wealth tax on real estate properties owned outside of Italy. Italian residents who own property abroad are obliged to pay the LVIE. The tax is paid by:

- owners of real estate for any use whatsoever, including those instrumental by nature
- Individuals possessing rights in rem such as usufruct, use, habitation, emphyteusis, and surface over the same property
- concessionaires, in the case of concession of state-owned areas
- renters, especially in the context of real estate, which can involve properties either currently being built or undergoing construction, leased through financing agreements.

The Imposta unica comunale (IUC) was a tax in the Italian tax system introduced by the Stability Law for 2014. The intention behind this tax was to make the regulations on local property taxation organic. Although its name implies a sense of unity, the IUC did not replace all municipal taxes; instead, it brought together three distinct components: the IMU (Imposta municipale propria), the TASI (Tributo per i servizi indivisibili) and the TARI (Tassa sui rifiuti). With the Budget Law 2020, TASI is abolished and replaced by the new IMU.

- IMU (Imposta municipale propria): Single municipal tax or own municipal tax is the tax due for the ownership of buildings, excluding main homes classified in cadastral categories.
- TASI (Tributo per i servizi indivisibili): The tax for indivisible services contributes to the financing of the indivisible services provided by the municipality (e.g.: roads, public lighting, green areas).
- TARI (Tassa sui rifiuti): The waste tax is the tax intended to finance the costs relating to the waste collection and disposal service and is payable by anyone who owns or holds for any reason premises or open areas liable to produce such waste.

=== Jamaica ===
This tax is paid annually and is based on a percentage of the unimproved value of a property.

=== Lithuania ===
The tax period for a property tax is a calendar year. Property tax rate ranging from 0.3% to 1% the tax value of real estate is determined by the municipality.

Since 1 January 2015 if the person's property value is higher than 220,000 euros, then a 0.5 per cent tax applies to the excess.

=== Luxembourg ===
Property tax in Luxembourg is calculated on the basis of the property's "unitary value" determined by tax authorities and levied by the communes. The tax is calculated as property unitary value * assessment rate * communal rate. The assessment rate is determined by the legislator and generally ranges from 0.7% to 1%. The communal rate is set by the communal authority and varies from 120% to 900% depending on the municipality.

Luxembourg has minimal property taxes compared to its neighbours in Benelux or in the European Union. It amounts to more or less €150 for a €500,000 apartment in Luxembourg City.

=== Poland ===
Property tax in Poland is a local tax regulated in Act on Local Taxes and Fees of 12 January 1991. Property tax levied on the possession of land, buildings and structures. The tax is calculated on the basis of the area of the property, and the obligation to pay it rests on the owner, perpetual usufructuary or person with limited rights in rem. The amount of tax is determined annually by the municipality that collects the tax, within the limits specified by law. For example, the maximum rates for 2025 are:

- up to PLN 1.38/m² for land used for business activities,
- up to PLN 0.73/m² for other land,
- up to PLN 34/m² for buildings used for business activities,
- up to PLN 1.19/m² for residential buildings.

=== Czech Republic ===
There are two types of property tax in the Czech Republic: tax on land and tax on buildings and apartment units.

All land in the jurisdiction of the Czech Republic is subject to the property tax on land with the following exceptions: land which is covered by buildings (such land is not taxed only on that portion where a building is built on it), forests, body of water, land designated for the defense of the country. The payer of the tax is the owner of the land. There are different types of taxes on land depending on their purpose (fields have a lower coefficient than land designated for industrial purposes). There is a difference in the tax on building plots (ie. land on which a building/improvement can be built on it, but which currently sits empty). Such building plots with no actual buildings on it have a constant coefficient 2 Kč per square metre whereas building plots with a building on it (the portion of building plots not covered by any particular building) are taxed according to the number of residents and the location of each particular village/town/city.

The property tax on buildings imposes a tax on all buildings and accommodation units in the jurisdiction of the Czech Republic apart from those buildings composed of accommodation units that are already taxed (eg. block of flats,...). Real property owners are the ones responsible to pay all assessed property taxes. The tax base from buildings and accommodations units is the area of the built-up surface.

Facts for both taxes:

1. All property tax revenue levied from real property located in a particular village/town/city gets paid via the corresponding national tax office branch, which in turn redistributes such revenue back to that particular village/town/city in which the taxed real property is located
2. Every village/town/city is authorized to adjust its coefficient on property tax (which can be 1, 2, 3, 4, or 5 – which means how many times the originally assessed tax will be multiplied)
3. The tax year corresponds to the calendar year
4. A property tax return must be filed to the corresponding national tax office branch by the end of January following the tax year only if a new transaction occurred in the tax year (such as a transfer of ownership) or any other change in the property occurred. Otherwise, there is no need to file a property tax return if no changes occurred during a given tax year.
5. The tax is paid in two exact equal payments by the end of May and November respectively. (As far as normal non businesses are concerned)

Important notion: Czech tax law differentiates between the person who pays tax and the person who holds the tax burden. When it comes to property taxes in the Czech Republic, it is always the same person.

=== Moldova ===
The law in Transnistria establishes tax rates for apartments (0.3%) and houses (0.2%).

=== Netherlands ===
Property tax (Dutch: Onroerendezaakbelasting (OZB)) is levied on property on a municipal basis. Only the owners of residential property and people who rent/own commercial space are taxed. People who rent a home do not pay property tax. Municipalities combine their property taxes with a tax for garbage collection and for the sewer system. Owners and users of property and land also pay taxes based on the value of property to the water boards for flood protection and water and wastewater treatment (waterschapsbelasting). A percentage of the value of a house (eigenwoningforfait, previously huurwaardeforfait) is added to the income of the owner, so the owner of a house pays more income tax. All property-related taxes are based on the value of the house estimated by the municipality.

=== Portugal ===
Portugal has divided their property taxation into two brackets, pre-purchase taxes and post-purchase taxes (of property).

Pre-Purchase/ Purchasing Real Estate Taxes: If an individual is looking to buy real estate in Portugal, they can be expected to pay a multitude of taxes. First, the individual will have to pay the 'Portugal Property Transfer Tax' (as referred to as 'IMPOSTO MUNICIPAL SOBRE AS TRANSMISSÕES ONEROSAS DE IMÓVEIS). This tax is applied when there is a transfer of ownership of a certain property. The rates of this tax can range from as low as 1% and up to 8%-- these taxes are dependent on a few considerations, which include "the purchase price for the real estate, the location of the property, and whether it is the first or second home in Portugal." In addition, a 'Stamp Tax' (Imposto de Selo) will also be a prepurchase tax applied before the sale of real estate. This is one of the oldest taxes in Portugal, and it is applied to all the official paperwork, such as deeds, contracts, mortgage agreements, and bank statements that make the sale legal and 'official' according to the courts. This responsibility "is accounted for by the buyer, charged at a fixed rate of 0.8% of the property's registered fiscal value."

Post Purchase Real Estate Taxes: Property Tax (also known as: "IMI – Imposto Municipal Sobre Imóveis") is "computed on the tax registration value of urban and rural properties located in Portuguese territory." IMI is based on the type of property one possesses: "Urban property- 0.3 to 0.45%, Rural property- 0.8% Property owned by residents in offshores (except individuals)- 7.5%." There are also quite a few tax reductions and exemptions individuals can qualify/ take advantage of properties that are considered a permanent residence (only viable for three years), residencies that have an occupant with multiple dependents registered to them, property that is deemed low in value and is owned by individuals of a low socio-economic standard according to the government, property that is considered a part of the tourism circuit, property that can help with renewable energy and even stores deemed historical or culturally impactful.

=== Romania ===
Depending if it's a juridical person or not, for residential buildings, a 0.1% tax is levied against the value of the building or apartment and a 0.2% tax against a non-residential building.

=== Slovakia ===
The law in Slovakia distinguishes 3 types of the real estate tax (Slovak: Daň z nehnuteľností): – Land tax – Building tax – Tax on apartments and non-residential premises in an apartment building.

The administration of real estate tax is handled by the municipality in whose territory the real estate lies. In cities with multiple city districts, the tax administration of real estate tax is handled by the department of local taxes and fees and not by the city districts. For example, Bratislava or Košice.

==== Origin and termination of tax liability ====
The tax liability arises on 1 January of the tax period following the tax period in which the taxpayer became the owner, administrator, tenant, or user of the taxable property and expires on 31 December of the tax period in which the taxpayer lost ownership, administration, lease or use of the real estate. If the taxpayer becomes the owner, administrator, tenant, or user of the real estate on 1 January, the current tax period, the tax liability arises on this day. The decisive factor for the collection of the tax as of 1 January is one tax period. Changes in taxable facts that occur during the tax period are not taken into account.

==== Declaration ====
The tax return is filed by the taxpayer, whose law on local taxes defines separately for land, buildings, flats, and non-residential parameters. The taxpayer files a tax return for the tax period in which the tax liability was incurred. The taxpayer (i.e., the taxable person) is obliged to pay the real estate tax return to the relevant tax administrator (i.e., the Municipality) by 31 January of the liability period. In other tax periods, the tax return is not filed, and the taxpayer receives a decision on the tax levied by the administrator. For example, if you acquire a property on 25 August 2019, you are required to pay the tax return by 31 January 2020. However, only if the property is registered in the real estate cadastre on 1 January 2020. A taxpayer who acquired the property by auction during the tax period is obliged to file the return within 30 days from the date of the tax liability.

==== Co-ownership ====
If the land, building, flat, and non-residential space in a residential building are co-owned by several persons, the declaration shall be submitted by each individual or legal person. Specifically, the co-owner should state the real estate tax up to the amount of his co-ownership share. If the co-owners agree, the declaration will be submitted by a chosen representative. If this occurs, all co-owners are obliged to mention this fact in the declaration. This does not apply to spouses who own land, a building, a flat, or a non-residential space in an apartment building in the non-share co-ownership of the spouses. In this case, the declaration is filed by one of the spouses.

==== How to proceed when filing a tax return ====
The tax return is filed in the prescribed documentation depending on whether it is an individual or a legal entity. To complete the documentation, it is necessary to send documents that prove changes in one's property (e.g., a copy of the decision to allow a deposit in the real estate cadastre, a decision on inheritance, etc.). Possible changes in the ownership of real estate are, for example, the sale or purchase of the real estate, inheritance, donation, building approval, removal of the building, and the like. The duly completed form must be submitted to the city or municipal office in person or by appointing a representative.

==== Electronic services ====
The law does not stipulate the obligation of the municipality to finance electronic services, and thus e.g. during the tax return by electronic means while providing for the possibility of providing them. Whether it is possible to communicate with the tax administrator electronically, the municipality shall publish on its website in the form of an adopted generally binding regulation in which the details of electronic communication and provision of electronic services are laid down.

==== Exemption from tax ====
- land, buildings, flats, and non-residential premises owned by the municipality which is the tax administrator, and land, buildings, flats, and non-residential premises owned or managed by city districts in Bratislava and Košice,
- land and buildings owned by another state used by individual who have privileges and immunities under international law and are not citizens of the Slovak Republic, provided that reciprocity is guaranteed,
- land and buildings or parts thereof owned by churches and religious societies registered by the state, which are used for education, scientific research purposes, or the performance of religious ceremonies,
- land and buildings or parts thereof owned by public universities or owned by the state under the administration of state universities for higher education or scientific research purposes,
- land and buildings or parts thereof owned by the state under the administration of the Slovak Academy of Sciences or owned by a public research institution used for scientific research purposes,
- land and buildings or parts thereof owned by the state or self-governing regions serving kindergartens, primary education, secondary education, and higher vocational education, and serving practical training centers, and if they are within the founding competence of the state or self-governing regions,
- lands of publicly accessible parks owned by medical facilities providing institutional health care,
- land, buildings, and non-residential premises owned by the Slovak Red Cross.

==== Payment of tax ====
The tax administrator will send an assessment for the relevant tax period, stating the amount of tax, usually by 15 May. The levied real estate tax is payable within 15 days from the date of entry into force of the decision.

The tax administrator may also determine the payment of real estate tax in installments, while the due date of individual installments shall be determined in the decision by which the tax is levied. If the tax levied is higher than EUR 33,000, the city/municipality shall determine the payment of the tax in at least two equal installments. You can also pay the tax at once, but within the first installment.

==== Sanctions ====
If you do not file a tax return for real estate tax within the deadline, the tax administrator will impose a fine of up to the amount of tax levied, not less than 5 euros, but not more than 3,000 euros.

=== Sweden ===
==== Municipal and national property taxes ====
There are the following categories for single-family dwellings in Sweden:

- Single-family dwelling - municipal property tax is 0,75% of the property's taxable value (limit - there is a maximum tax)
- Newly constructed single-family dwellings and owner-occupied flats
  - for valuation year after 2012 - not subject to any municipal property tax for the first 15 years
  - for valuation year before 2012, different
  - (valuation year = the year when the construction of the house was completed)
- Single family-dwelling presently under construction
- Several residential buildings on the same plot of a single-family land plot
- Single-family dwelling on freehold land
- Leasehold land
- Undeveloped single-family plots

Other categories include Agriculture, Owner occupied flats, Tenement building, Industrial premises, etc.

Rental income is taxed as part of a taxpayer's annual income.

==== Penalties ====
In case of submitting false or inadequate information in a tax return, the taxpayer faces a penalty. An individual can be charged up to 40% of the tax; the amount differs (depending on the type of disinformation).

In case of late filling, the consequences are similar.

==== Payment ====
Tax payments are made in monthly instalments. Taxpayers have 90 days to pay any owed balance; in case of overpaying the money is refunded within a year from the end of the fiscal year.

=== Spain ===
Property tax in Spain refers to the various taxes associated with buying, selling, and owning real estate within the country's borders. These taxes differ for residents and non-residents and encompass a range of fiscal obligations that property owners must navigate.

Buying Property Tax: The acquisition of property in Spain entails the payment of several taxes, typically ranging from 8% to 11.5% of the property's value. This applies to both newly built properties, often sold by banks or construction companies, and resale properties previously owned by individuals. The tax burden is distributed among different parties involved in the transaction, with specific percentages allocated to various tax categories.

Selling Property Tax: When selling property in Spain, sellers face obligations related to Plusvalia and Capital Gains Tax.

- Plusvalia: A council tax which is a tax levied by the local Town Hall, calculated based on the increase in the land's value (known as valor catastral) over the ownership period. Each beneficiary is responsible for paying the tax on any single asset exceeding their individual share of the asset's value.
- Capital Gains Tax: The Capital Gains Tax is 19% for non residents from European Economic Area and 24% for non residents from other countries. For residents the capital gains tax ranges from 19% to 23% but they can also get tax relief if they have lived in the property for at least three years before selling it.

Real Estate Tax (Impuesto sobre Bienes Inmuebles): The tax is imposed on the value of ownership and other rights pertaining to real estate situated within the municipality responsible for tax collection. The tax is levied by local councils. Its administration is a joint responsibility between the State Administration and local councils. It was enacted on January 1, 1990. The real estate tax ranges from 0.4% to 1.1% based on the region.

Refuse Collection: A small tax paid annually and collected by local municipality. It covers drainage & refuse collection.

=== United Kingdom ===
In the UK the ownership of residential property or freehold land is not taxed, a situation almost unique in the OECD. Instead, the Council Tax is usually paid by the resident of a property, and only in the case of unoccupied property does the owner become liable to pay it (although owners can often obtain a discount or an exemption for empty properties).

HM Revenue and Customs (HMRC) guidelines state:

"Council Tax is a tax on property. In principle it may be an allowable deduction in those instances where other property-based expenses are deductible."

The Valuation Tribunal Service states that:

"The tax is a mix of a property tax and a personal tax. Generally, where two or more persons reside in a dwelling the full tax is payable. If one person resides in the dwelling, then 75% is payable. An empty dwelling attracts only a 50% charge unless the billing authority has made a determination otherwise."

The Council Tax depends on the value of the property, but is not calculated as a simple percentage. Instead, the property is allocated to a Council Tax band (9 in England and 8 in Scotland and Wales). Valuation is carried out by the Valuation Office Agency under the auspices of HMRC.

Stamp Duty Land Tax (SDLT) is a progressive tax which applies when purchasing "a residential property or a piece of land in England or Northern Ireland". As of 2023, the purchase of a primary residence worth up to £250,000, by a UK resident, is tax-free with respect to SDLT. Some purchases by non-UK residents are subject to a further 2% surcharge. Purchases of non-primary residences are subject to an increased SDLT rate schedule. As of 2023, a first-time buyer of a primary residence receives SDLT relief, for properties worth up to £625,000, in the form of reduced SDLT rates (including a 0% bracket up to £425,000).

SDLT was replaced by Land and Buildings Transaction Tax (LBTT) in Scotland in 2015, and Land Transaction Tax (LTT) in Wales in 2018. These devolved taxes are broadly similar to SDLT, but with different bands and rates. Neither tax includes a non-resident surcharge, and there is no first-time buyer relief for LTT.

=== United States ===
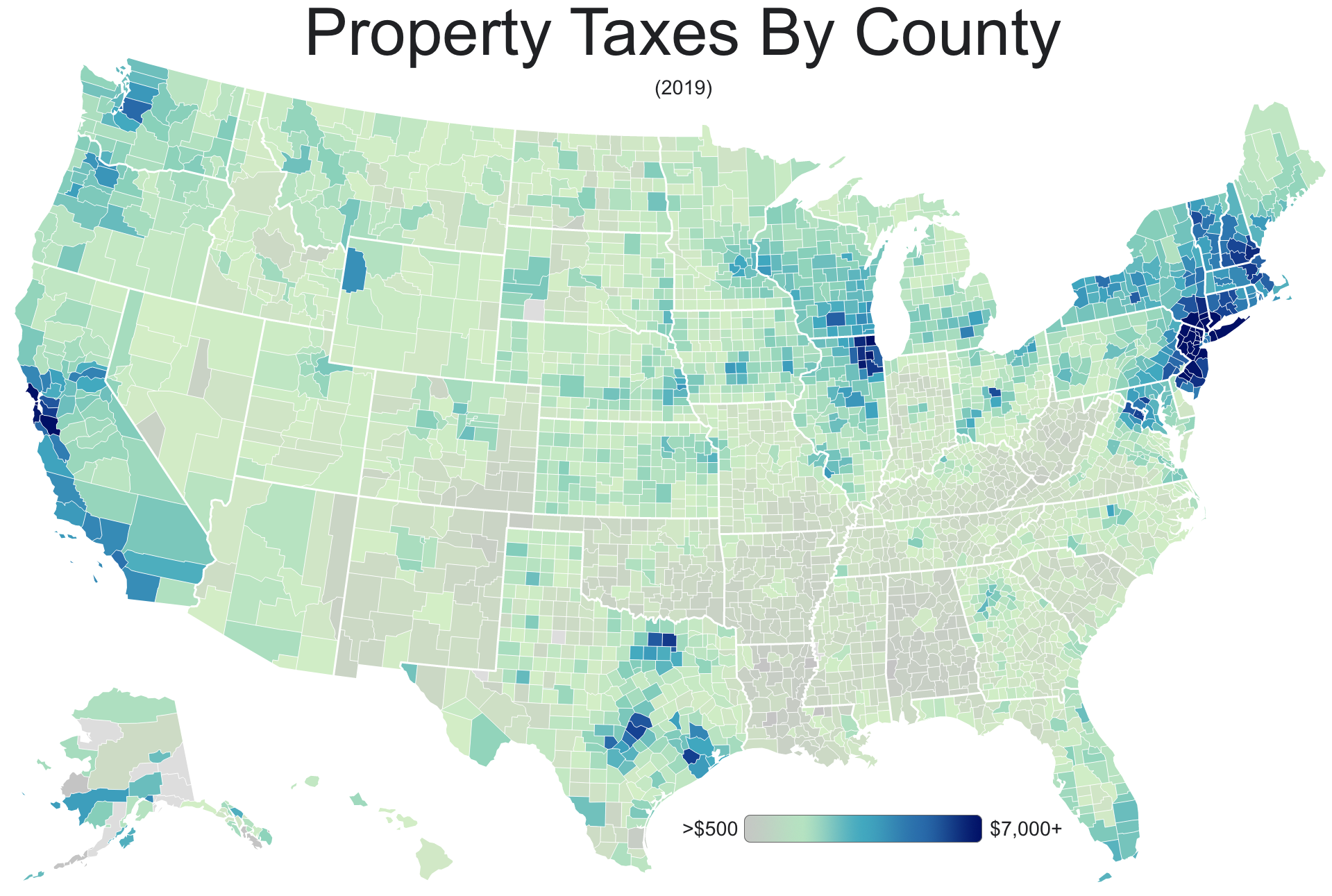
Median property tax paid by county -$500, $1,000, $2,000, $3,000, $4,000, $5,000, $6,000, $7,000+

In the United States, property tax on real estate is usually levied by the local government. The national government levies no real estate tax, nor property tax. State governments levy 3% of the total property tax collected. The other 97% is collected by counties, municipalities, schools, community colleges, and many other special-purpose governmental agencies, e.g. libraries, museums, parks, bridge authorities. Rates vary across the states, between about 0% and 4% of the home value. The assessment comprises two components: the improvement (or building value) and the land or site value. The property tax is the main tax supporting local education, police, fire protection, government, roads, and most infrastructure, e.g. sewers, bridges, street lights. Many state and local jurisdictions add personal property taxes.

== Places without property tax ==
=== East Asia ===
- People's Republic of China: The Chinese government owns all lands in China and the government does not tax homeowners.

=== Middle East ===
- Kuwait

=== Africa ===
- Mauritania

=== North America ===
- Greenland

=== Europe ===
- Faroe Islands
- Malta

=== Oceania ===
- Palau
- Norfolk Island
- Cook Islands
- American Samoa

=== United States ===
In Alaska, "...only a small portion of the land mass is subject to a property tax. ...only 24 municipalities in Alaska (either cities or boroughs) levy a property tax." However, the vast majority of revenue for local governments comes from property taxes. There is no tax on the private land in American Samoa, the Territory of Palmyra Island or Kingman Reef in the Pacific Ocean insular areas.

== See also ==
- Georgism
- Harberger Tax
- Henry George
- Land value tax
