= Estate Duty Ordinance =

Legislation of Hong Kong

Legislative Council of Hong Kong
- Long title: An Ordinance to amend and consolidate the law relating to estate duty.
- Citation: Cap. 111
- Enacted by: Legislative Council of Hong Kong

Legislative history
- Introduced by: Attorney General C. G. Alabaster
- First reading: 28 January 1932
- Second reading: 11 February 1932
- Third reading: 25 February 1932
- Status: Current legislation

The Estate Duty Ordinance is one of Hong Kong ordinances. It regulates the HK estate duty which was a tax imposed on capital asset - the net value of property situated in Hong Kong at the date of the taxpayer's death. It is chargeable irrespective of whether the deceased was a resident of Hong Kong.

== Most commonly used sections ==
Cap 111 EDO Section.2 Application

- This Ordinance is to apply in the case of every deceased person who dies on or after January 1, 1916, and before February 11, 2006.

Cap 111 EDO Section.3 Interpretation

- Some terms used in this Ordinance are interpreted including the following key words:
  - "account" (遺產呈報表)
  - "affidavit for the Commissioner" (遺產申報誓章)
  - "executor" (遺囑執行人) means the executor or administrator of a deceased person.
  - "property passing on the death" (去世時轉移的財產)

Cap 111 EDO Section.5 Estate duty

Cap 111 EDO Section.6 What property is deemed to pass on death

Cap 111 EDO Section.10 Exceptions for transactions with money consideration, non-HK property, stocks & certain land in the N.T. HK.

Cap 111 EDO Section.10A Exceptions for matrimonial home

Cap 111 EDO Section.12 Payment of estate duty

Cap 111 EDO Section.13 Value of property; allowance for debts and funeral expenses

Cap 111 EDO Section.16 Increase of estate duty when delay in lodging affidavit

Cap 111 EDO Section.18 Charge of estate duty on property

Cap 111 EDO Section.22 Appeal to Court of First Instance

Cap 111 EDO Section.31 Relief in respect of quick succession where property consists of leasehold property or a business

Cap 111 EDO Section.34 Controlled companies

Cap 111 EDO Section.35 Charge on assets of controlled companies

Cap 111 EDO Section.44 Value of shares and debentures of controlled companies

Cap 111 EDO Section.45 Limitation on dispositions through a controlled company in favour of relatives

Cap 111 Sched 1 Table of Estate duty rates to be payable

== Reference links ==
- Hong Kong Estate Duty Ordinance Cap.111
- HK Inland Revenue Department: The introduction of EDO & the "Revenue (Abolition of Estate Duty) Ordinance 2005".
