= Stamp Duty Ordinance =

Legislation of Hong Kong

Legislative Council of Hong Kong
- Long title: An Ordinance to consolidate and amend the law relating to stamp duty.
- Citation: Cap. 117
- Enacted by: Legislative Council of Hong Kong
- Commenced: 29 May 1981

Legislative history
- Introduced by: Financial Secretary Sir Charles Philip Haddon-Cave
- Introduced: 27 February 1981
- First reading: 11 March 1981
- Second reading: 27 May 1981
- Third reading: 27 May 1981
- Status: Current legislation

Stamp Duty Ordinance
- Traditional Chinese: 印花稅條例
Transcriptions
Yue: Cantonese
- Yale Romanization: Yan fāa seui tìuh laih
- Jyutping: Jan3 faa1 soei3 tiu4 lai6

The Stamp Duty Ordinance is one of Hong Kong Ordinances which regulates the law of stamp duty.

== Some notable sections of the ordinance ==
- Section 2 - Interpretation: This section introduce the terms always appear in this ordinance. The examples are Hong Kong bearer instrument, Hong Kong stock, conveyance, contract note.
- Section 4 - Charging of, liability for, and recovery of stamp duty
- Section 8 - Duplicates and counterparts
- Section 9 - Late stamping
- Section 10 - How instruments to be written, charged and stamped
- Section 13 - Adjudication of stamp duty by Collector
- Section 14 - Appeal against assessment
- Section 15 - Non-admissibility, etc. of instruments not duly stamped
- Section 16 - Provisions relating to certain leases etc.
- Section 18I - Power of Collector to inspect instrument or evidence
- Section 19 - Contract notes, etc. in respect of sale and purchase of Hong Kong stock
- Section 22 - Stamp duty chargeable where consideration in respect of immovable property consists of stock or security other than stock
- Section 24 - Stamp duty chargeable where conveyance etc. is in consideration of debt etc.
- Section 29H - Exemptions and relief
- Section 31 - Duty of trustees and managers to keep records
- Section 45 - Relief in case of conveyance from one associated body corporate to another: regulate relief between parent companies and subsidiaries.
- Section 53 - Liability for offences by bodies corporate
- Section 54 - Inspection of books of account etc.
- Section 56 - Offences relating to stamps
- Schedule 1 - The Hong Kong stamp duty heading
  - Head 1: All transactions of sale or lease of interests in Hong Kong immovable property.
  - Head 2: The transfer of Hong Kong Stock.
  - Head 3: All Hong Kong bearer instruments.
  - Head 4: Any duplicates and counterparts of the above documents.
