= British Columbia Home Owner Mortgage and Equity Partnership =

The British Columbia Home Owner Mortgage and Equity partnership is a program offered by the Government of British Columbia to first-time homebuyers who have been either citizens or permanent residents of Canada for the last five years and have been residents of British Columbia for at least a year before applying and have never owned a home. The province offers qualifying individuals an amount to match their down payment which is limited to 5% of the purchase price of a home not exceeding $750,000.

Applications can be filed starting January 17, 2017.
