= Inland Revenue Department (Hong Kong) =

Department of the Hong Kong Government

Agency overview
- Formed: 1 April 1947
- Headquarters: Inland Revenue Centre, 5 Concorde Road, Kai Tak, Kowloon, Hong Kong
- Employees: 2,925 (2020–21)
- Agency executive: Tam Tai-pang, Commissioner of Inland Revenue
- Website: ird.gov.hk

Inland Revenue Department
- Traditional Chinese: 稅務局
- Simplified Chinese: 税务局
- Literal meaning: Tax Service Office
Transcriptions
Standard Mandarin
- Hanyu Pinyin: Shuìwùjú
Yue: Cantonese
- Yale Romanization: Seui mouh guhk
- Jyutping: Seoi3 mou6 guk6

The Inland Revenue Department (IRD) is the Hong Kong government department responsible for collecting taxes and duties.

== History ==
The Inland Revenue Department was established on 1 April 1947. Initially it administered only one piece of legislation, the Inland Revenue Ordinance, which was enacted on 3 May 1947.

The department subsequently absorbed various elements of the Treasury, including the Estate Duty Office (in 1949), the Stamp Duty Office (1956), and responsibility for collection of entertainments, bets and sweeps, and public dance-halls taxes (1956).

In December 1979, the department's headquarters moved to Windsor House in Causeway Bay, a building that was specially designed with a second lift core for the department. In order to save on rental costs, the department moved again, in December 1991, to the eponymous government-owned Revenue Tower in Wanchai, where it remains headquartered as of 2020.

== Ordinances administered ==
The IRD is responsible for the administration of the following Hong Kong ordinances on taxes and duties and the related rules and regulations:

- Betting Duty Ordinance Cap.108
- Business Registration Ordinance Cap.310
- Estate Duty Ordinance Cap.111
- Hotel Accommodation Tax Ordinance Cap.348
- Inland Revenue Ordinance Cap.112
- Stamp Duty Ordinance Cap.117
- Tax Reserve Certificates Ordinance Cap.289

== Commissioners of Inland Revenue ==
- E.W. Pudney (1 January 1947 – 1 February 1951)
- W.F. Watson (2 February 1951 – 26 May 1957)
- W.J. Drysdale (1 April 1958 – 15 July 1963)
- A.D. Duffy (16 July 1963 – 11 May 1972)
- F.E. Rainbow (12 May 1972 – 26 January 1975)
- R.V. Giddy (21 January 1975 – 19 September 1979)
- V.A. Ladd (20 September 1979 – 31 July 1985)
- Anthony Au-yeung Fu (1 August 1985 – 23 April 1996)
- Wong Ho-sang, J.P. (24 April 1996 – 18 August 1999)
- Agnes Sin Law Yuk-lin (acting)
- Elmo Charles D'Souza (acting)
- Lau Mak Yee-ming, Alice (1 March 2001 – 5 December 2009)
- Chu Yam-yuen (6 December 2009 – 19 June 2013)
- Wong Kuen-fai (20 June 2013 – 19 August 2020)
- Tam Tai-pang (20 August 2020 – Present)
