= Centesima rerum venalium =

1% tax on goods sold at auctions in ancient Rome

Centesima rerum venalium (lit. 'hundredth of the value of everything sold') was a 1% tax on goods sold at auction during the Roman Empire.

== History ==
Tax revenues went into a fund to pay military retirement benefits (aerarium militare), along with those from a new sales tax (centesima rerum venalium), a 1% tax on goods sold at auction. The inheritance tax is extensively documented in sources pertaining to Roman law, inscriptions, and papyri. It was one of three major indirect taxes levied on Roman citizens in the provinces of the Empire.
