= Stamp duty =

Tax levied on property purchases or documents

Stamp duty is a tax that is levied on single property purchases or documents (including, historically, the majority of legal documents such as cheques, receipts, military commissions, marriage licences and land transactions). Historically, a physical revenue stamp had to be attached to or impressed upon the document to show that stamp duty had been paid before the document was legally effective. More modern versions of the tax no longer require an actual stamp.

The duty is thought to have originated in Venice in 1604, being introduced (or re-invented) in Spain in the 1610s, the Spanish Netherlands in the 1620s, France in 1651, and England in 1694.

German economist Silvio Gesell proposed in 1891 that demurrage currency could be enabled by stamp duties, which would in turn stimulate economic growth. Gesell referred to this monetary policy as Freigeld.

== Usage by country ==
=== Australia ===
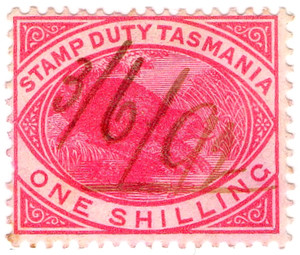
A Stamp Duty revenue stamp of Tasmania from 1892

The Australian Federal Government does not levy stamp duty. However, stamp duties are levied by the Australian states on various instruments (written documents) and transactions. Stamp duty laws can differ significantly between all eight jurisdictions. The rates of stamp duty also differ between the jurisdictions (typically up to 5.5%) as do the nature of instruments and transactions subject to duty. Some jurisdictions no longer require a physical document to attract what is now often referred to as "transfer duty".

Major forms of duty include transfer duty on the purchase of land (both freehold and leasehold), buildings, fixtures, plant and equipment, intangible business assets (such as goodwill and intellectual property) debts and other types of dutiable property. Another key type of duty is landholder duty, which is imposed on the acquisition of shares in a company or units in a trust that holds land above a certain value threshold.

=== Denmark ===
A temporary stamp duty was introduced in 1657 to finance the war with Sweden. It was made permanent in 1660 and remains on the statute book although it has been substantially altered. Most stamp duties were abolished from 1 January 2000 and the present act only provides for stamp duties on insurance policies. Stamp duties on land registration were renamed and transferred to a separate statute but remain essentially the same, i.e. 0.6% on deeds and 1.5% loans secured against real estate.

=== European Union ===
Stamp duty in the EU is limited in scope by the Capital Duties Directive (Council Directive 69/335/EEC of 17 July 1969 concerning indirect taxes on the raising of capital). This states that transactions subject to capital duty shall only be taxable in the Member State in whose territory the effective centre of management of a capital company is situated at the time when such transactions take place. When the effective centre of management of a capital company is situated in a third country and its registered office is situated in a Member State, transactions subject to capital duty shall be taxable in the Member State where the registered office is situated. When the registered office and the effective centre of management of a capital company are situated in a third country, the supplying of fixed or working capital to a branch situated in a Member State may be taxed in the Member State in whose territory the branch is situated.

The spirit of the Council Directive 2008/7/EC of 12 February 2008 concerning indirect taxes on the raising of capital is that capital duty interferes with the free movement of capital, and it prohibits capital duties altogether on the issue of securities (as opposed to the transfer). The Directive acknowledges that the best solution would be to abolish the duty, but allows those Member States that charged the duty as at 1 January 2006 may continue to do so under strict conditions. With this stamp duty Directive, Member States may not levy indirect tax on the raising of capital to capital companies in:

- contributions of capital;
- loans or services provided as part of contributions of capital;
- registration or other formalities required before commencing business because of the company's legal form;
- alteration of the instruments constituting the company, particularly when involving the conversion into a different type of company, the transfer of centre of effective management or registered office from one Member State to another, a change in the company's objects or the extension of its period of existence;
- restructuring operations.

Indirect taxes are also entirely prohibited on the issue of certain securities and debentures.

=== Greece ===
Greece, the fee was introduced by Legislative Decree 4755 Official Gazette Α΄164/15.5.1930 which was replaced by P.D. 28.7.1931/1931, also known as the Stamp Duties Code, in view of the impending bankruptcy. It stipulated that all loan contracts were subject to a 3.6% fee. On 9 August 2024, the bill was put to public consultation by the Ministry of National Economy and Finance which abolishes the stamp duty on more than 600 transactions and introduces the digital transaction fee on transactions, which remains the fee.

=== Hong Kong ===
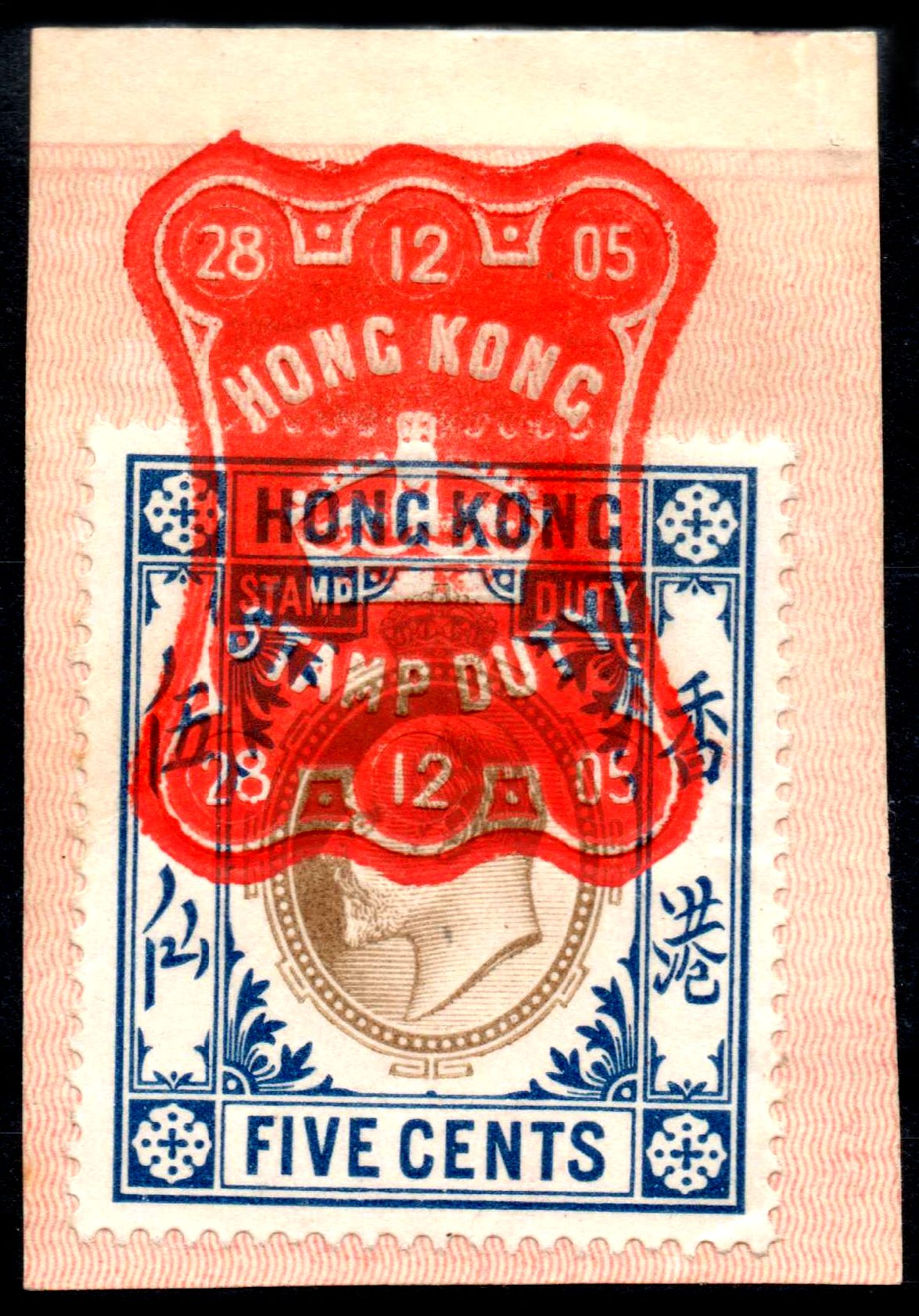
Historic Hong Kong stamp duty revenue stamp and overembossing die (1905). Actual stamps are no longer used.

According to Schedule 1 of Hong Kong Stamp Duty Ordinance Cap.117 (SDO), Stamp duty applies to some legal binding documents as classified into 4 heads:

- Head 1: All sale or lease transactions in Hong Kong immovable property.
- Head 2: The transfer of Hong Kong Stock.
- Head 3: All Hong Kong bearer instruments.
- Head 4: Any duplicates and counterparts of the above documents.

One example is shares of companies which are either incorporated in Hong Kong or listed on the Hong Kong Stock Exchange. Other than the said shares, Hong Kong Stock is defined as shares and marketable securities, units in unit trusts, and rights to subscribe for or to be allotted stock. Stamp duty on a conveyance on sale of land is charged at progressive rates ranging from 1.5% to 8.5% of the amount of consideration. The maximum rate of 8.5% applies where the consideration exceeds HK$21,739,130.

In addition, in response to the overheated property market, the Government has proposed in 2010 and 2012 two further types of stamp duties in respect of conveyances on sale of land:

- Head 1AA / 1B: Special Stamp Duty (SSD), which applies to residential properties resold within 3 years after purchase.
- Head 1AAB / 1C: Buyer's Stamp Duty (BSD), which applies to residential properties purchased by non-Hong Kong Permanent Residents or companies.

The SSD was enacted by the Legislative Council on 29 June 2011 and would take effect from 20 November 2010. An enhanced rate of the SSD and the BSD was enacted by the Legislative Council on 27 February 2014 but would take effect retrospectively from 27 October 2012. Both the SSD and BSD were abolished by the Stamp Duty (Amendment) Ordinance 2024, published in the Hong Kong Government Gazette on 19 April 2024.

Real Estate Agencies do usually arrange the stamping for Tenancy Agreements for residential apartments.

Hong Kong Government, through the Inland Revenue Department, also provides e-stamping with the same legal status as conventional stamp.

=== India ===
Indian laws require stamp duty payments on a limited category of transaction documents. Broadly, documents affecting rights and titles to property require stamp duties to be paid. The central government requires stamp duty to be paid on several classes of transaction documents, primarily focused on securities, under the Indian Stamp Act, 1899. In addition, stamp duty may be charged by the state government for other transactions depending on state-specific legislation. For example, Maharashtra state's stamp duty law is governed by the Maharashtra Stamp Act, 1958 (Bombay Act LX of 1958 ).

=== Indonesia ===
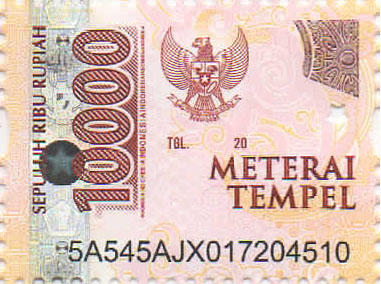
Current IDR 10,000 stamp duty from Indonesia

Stamp duty (meterai) is in use in Indonesia on a variety of legal documents. It continues to be necessary to stamp a document which is used to describe a civil instance or as evidence in court according to Law No. 10/2020 on Stamp Duty (UU No. 10 Tahun 2020 Tentang Bea Meterai).

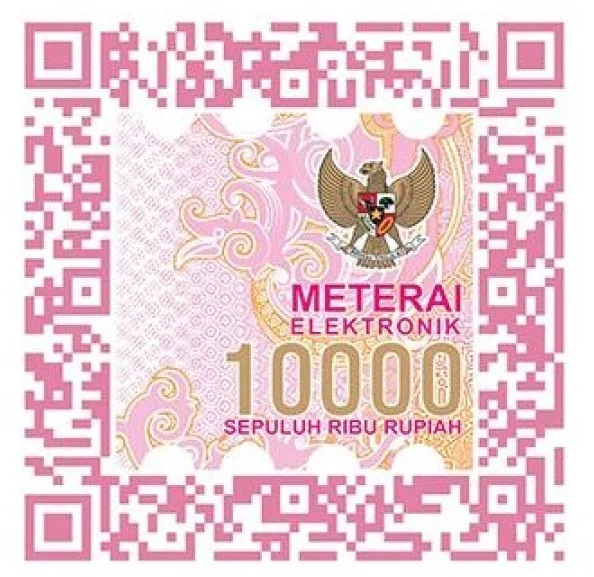
Electronic stamp duty from Indonesia

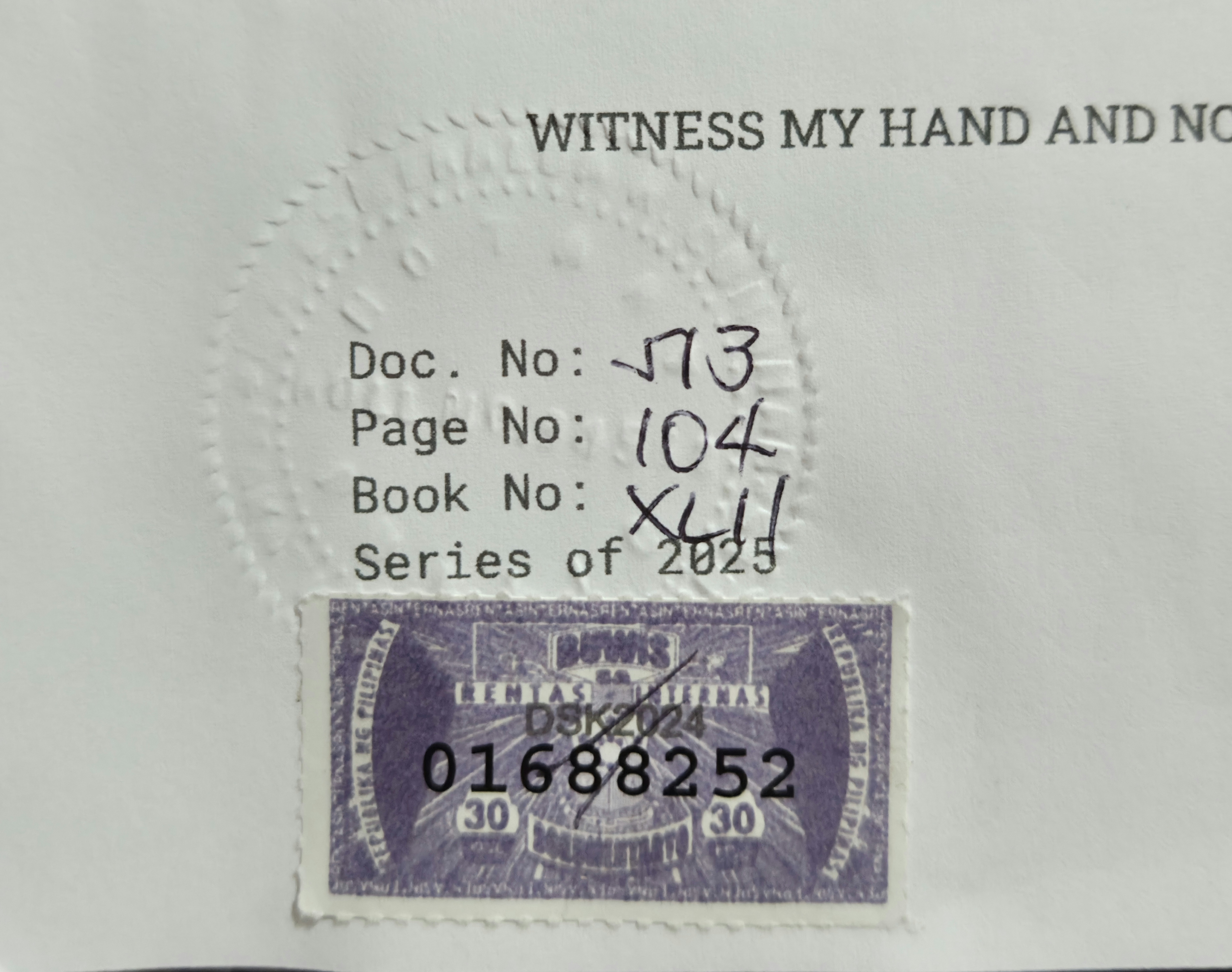
A notarized document in the Philippines with its notarial register number and a 30 peso stamp duty affixed and cancelled below it

Indonesian government, through Ministry of Finance, also launched electronic stamp duty (e-meterai) on 1 October 2021. This form of stamp duty affixed to digital documents such as PDF file in the form of special secure QR code developed by Perum Peruri. The digital document and its printed form is regarded as valid legal evidence according to Law No. 11/2008 on Information and Electronic Transactions (UU No. 11 Tahun 2008 Tentang Informasi dan Transaksi Elektronik).

=== Ireland ===
In the Republic of Ireland stamp duties are levied on various items including (but not limited to) credit cards, debit cards, ATM cards, cheques, property transfers, and certain court documents. Stamp duty was formerly a graduated progressive tax with the more expensive the house bought the greater the stamp duty rate. The top rate slowly increased from 0.5% in 1882 to 3% in 1947, 5% in 1973, 6% in 1975, reaching its peak at 9% in 1997. The budget of 2008 inaugurated a series of rate reductions. After 2011 the stamp duty tax is set at 1% for residential properties up to €1 million and 2% on the remaining amount. Non-residential real property, building, insurance policies, the intangible business property goodwill are taxed at 2%. A lease for property of any type is taxed according to the lease duration, 1% of the average annual rent, or the market rate whichever is greater, if 35 years or less, 6% up to 100 years, and 12% for a lease of more than 100 years duration. Counterparts (duplicate copies) of documents are taxed the lesser of €12.50 or the duty on the original document. The value of property for stamp duty excludes VAT. Gifts are taxed at market value. Several exemptions including those for gifts between close relatives and first time home buyers expired in 2010. The transfer of stocks and marketable securities is taxed at 1% if over €1,000 or if a gift. Stock warrants in bearer form are taxed at 3% of the value of the shares, and the issue of (new) bearer warrants was prohibited effective 1 June 2015.

=== Philippines ===
On 10 June 2025, the Bureau of Internal Revenue (BIR) issued a Revenue Memorandum Circular requiring strict compliance to the Documentary Stamp Tax on documents that will be notarized by Notary Publics. This requires Notary Publics to purchase stamps from the BIR for physical affixture on the document that will be notarized. Each stamp is worth 30 Philippine pesos and must be bought from the Notary Public's local revenue district office.

The BIR also taxes documents such as corporate stocks, debt instruments, insurance policies, and bank checks.

=== Singapore ===
From 1998, stamp duty in Singapore only applies to documents relating to immovable property, stocks and shares. Purchases of Singapore property or shares traded on the Singapore Exchange, are subject to stamp duty. The Inland Revenue Authority of Singapore (IRAS) mandates stamp duty payment within 14 days from signing of the document if done in Singapore and 30 days if the document is signed overseas. Failure in payment within the fixed time entails heavy penalty.

Applicable rates and more information can be obtained from IRAS. Legislation covering Singapore Stamp Duties are found in the Stamp Duties Act.

=== Sweden ===
Swedish law applies a stamp duty on property deeds, at 1.5% of the purchase value. In addition, a stamp duty of 2.0% is levied on new mortgage securities ("pantbrev") for properties.

=== United Kingdom ===
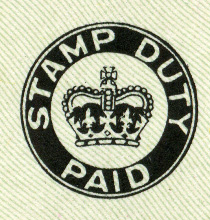
The "Stamp Duty Paid" mark that appeared on British cheques from 1956 to 1971. There is now no duty on British cheques.

"Stamp Duty Reserve Tax" (SDRT) was introduced on agreements to transfer certain shares and other securities in 1986, albeit with a relief for intermediaries such as market makers and large banks that are members of a qualifying exchange. "Stamp Duty Land Tax" (SDLT), a new transfer tax derived from stamp duty, was introduced for land and property transactions from 1 December 2003. SDLT is not a stamp duty, but a form of self-assessed transfer tax charged on "land transactions".

On 24 March 2010, Chancellor Alistair Darling introduced two significant changes to UK Stamp Duty Land Tax. For first-time buyers purchasing a property under £250,000, Stamp Duty Land Tax was abolished for the next two years. This measure was offset by a rise from 4% to 5% in Stamp Duty Land Tax on residential properties costing more than £1 million.

Further reforms were announced in December 2014, so that rates are now paid only on the part of the property price within each tax band.

In the 2015 Autumn Statement the Chancellor announced that buyers of second homes (whether Buy to let or holiday homes) would pay an additional 3% with effect from April 2016.

The Budget in 2017 abolished stamp duty for first-time home buyers in England and Wales purchasing homes up to £300,000, saving first-time buyers up to £5,000. Additionally, first-time buyers spending up to £500,000 will only pay stamp duty at 5% on the amount in excess of £300,000. Those spending over £500,000 will pay full stamp duty.

Government defines first-time buyers as "... an individual or individuals who have never owned an interest in a residential property in the United Kingdom or anywhere else in the world and who intends to occupy the property as their main residence."

Stamp Duty Land Tax only applies throughout England and Northern Ireland. In Scotland, SDLT was replaced by Land and Buildings Transaction Tax on 1 April 2015. In Wales, Land Transaction Tax was introduced in May 2018.

=== United States ===
Although the federal government formerly imposed various documentary stamp taxes on deeds, notes, insurance premiums and other transactional documents, in modern times such taxes are only imposed by states. Typically when real estate is transferred or sold, a real estate transfer tax will be collected at the time of registration of the deed in the public records. In addition, many states impose a tax on mortgages or other instruments securing loans against real property. This tax, known variously as a mortgage tax, intangibles tax, or documentary stamp tax, is also usually collected at the time of registration of the mortgage or deed of trust with the recording authority.

== See also ==
- Financial transaction tax
- Stamp duty in the United Kingdom
- Transfer tax
