= Economy of Hong Kong =

Set of productive activities developed in Hong Kong

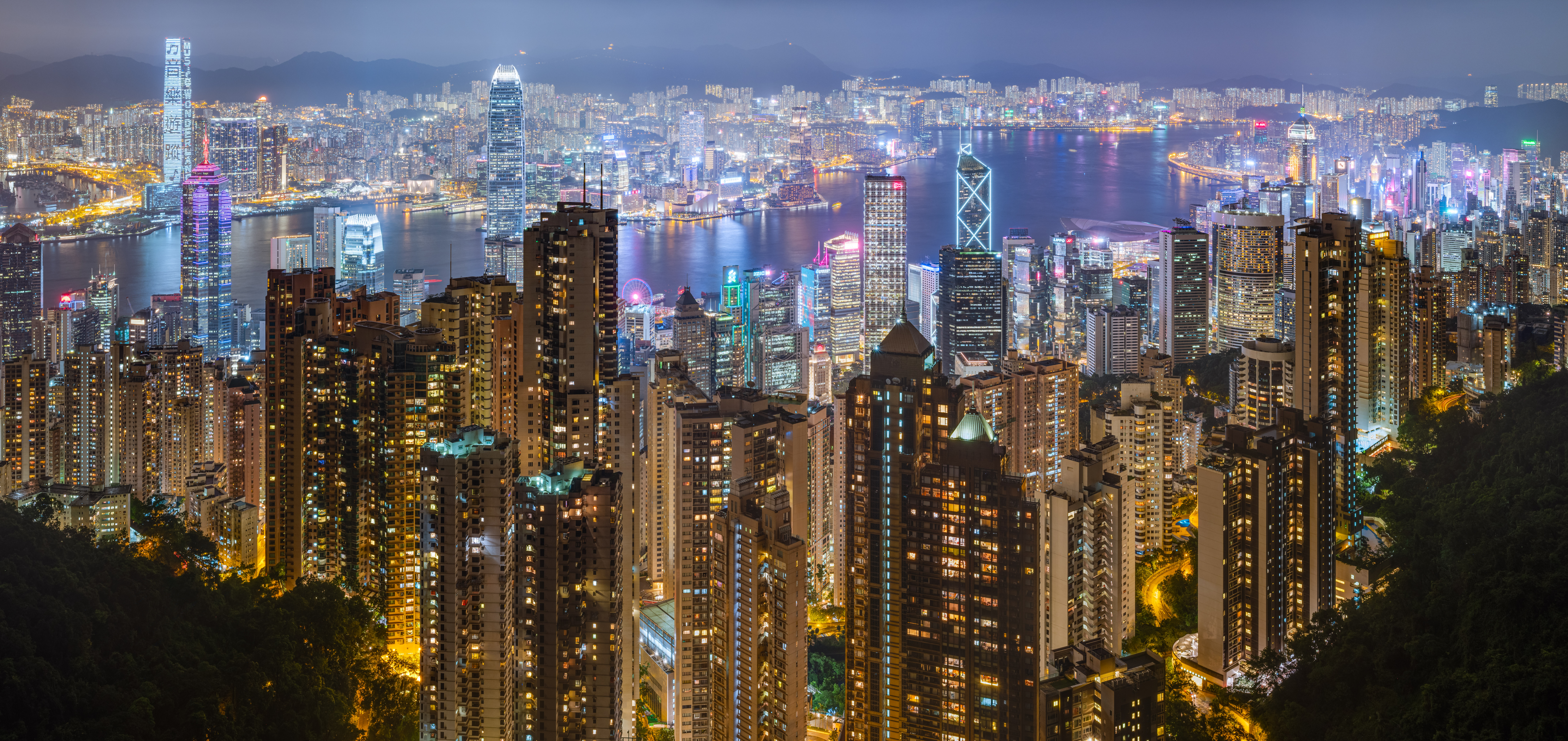
- Central and Victoria Harbour of Hong Kong
- Currency: Hong Kong dollar (HKD)
- Fiscal year: 1 April – 31 March
- Trade organisations: APEC, WTO, Group of Twenty (Chinese delegation), One Belt One Road, AII and ICC etc.
- Country group: Advanced economy; High-income economy

Statistics
- Population: ▲7,527,500 (2025)
- GDP: ▲$450.138 Billion (nominal; 2026); ▲$635.594 Billion (PPP; 2026)
- GDP growth: ▲3.7% (2022); ▲3.2% (2023); ▲2.5% (2024f); ▲3.5% (2025)
- GDP per capita: ▲$59,640 (nominal; 2026); ▲$84,211 (PPP; 2026)
- GDP by sector: Agriculture: 0.1%; Industry: 6.4%; Services: 93.6%; (2024)
- Inflation (CPI): 1.9% (2022)
- Population below national poverty line: 19.9% (2016 est.)
- Gini coefficient: 39.7 medium (Note: After adjustment for taxes and social transfers) (2021)
- Human Development Index: ▲0.956 very high (2022) (4th); ▲0.840 very high IHDI (21st) (2022)
- Labour force: ▼3,385,727 (2024); ▼55.6% employment rate (2024)
- Labour force by occupation: Agriculture, fishing, mining and quarrying: 0.1%; Manufacturing: 1.0%; Electricity, gas, water supply, and waste management: 1.1%; Construction: 4.4%; Wholesale and retail trade, restaurants and hotels: 19.6%; Transport and communications: 9.5%; Financing, insurance, real estate, professional and business service: 43.5%; Community, social, and personal services: 20.9%
- Unemployment: 4.3% (2022)
- Average gross salary: HK$ 28,340; US$ 3,661 per month (2022 May)
- Average net salary: HK$ 23,807; US$ 3,070 per month (2022 May)
- Main industries: Financing and insurance, import and export trade, professional and business services

External
- Exports: $582.1 billion (2024)
- Main export partners: Mainland China 59.0%; United States 6.5%; Vietnam 3.2%; Taiwan 3.1%; India 3.0% (2024)
- Imports: $630.8 billion (2024)
- Main import partners: Mainland China 43.6%; Taiwan 11.3%; Singapore 7.9%; South Korea 5.8%; Japan 4.6% (2024)
- FDI stock: ▲$2.2 trillion (31 December 2017 est.); ▲ Abroad: $2.036 trillion (31 December 2017 est.)
- Current account: ▲$14.75 billion (2017 est.)
- Gross external debt: ▼$633.6 billion (31 December 2017 est.)

Public finance
- Government debt: 0.1% of GDP (2017 est.)
- Foreign reserves: $430.7 billion (April 2023)
- Budget balance: +5.2% (of GDP) (2017 est.)
- Revenue: 79.34 billion (2017 est.)
- Spending: 61.64 billion (2017 est.)
- Credit rating: Standard & Poor's: AAA (Domestic); AAA (Foreign); AAA (T&C Assessment); Outlook: Stable; Moody's: Aa3; Outlook: Negative; Fitch: AA+ Outlook: Stable
- All values, unless otherwise stated, are in US dollars.

Hong Kong has a highly developed free-market economy. It is characterised by low taxation, almost free port trade and a well-established international financial market. The Hong Kong dollar is legally issued by three major international commercial banks, and since 1983 has pegged to the US dollar. Interest rates are determined by individual banks in Hong Kong to ensure that they are market driven. There is no officially recognised central banking system, although the Hong Kong Monetary Authority functions as a financial regulatory authority.

Highly dependent on international trade and finance, it is regarded as a favorable place to start a company. A study showed that Hong Kong went from 998 registered start-ups in 2014 to 4694 in 2024, with Fintech (13%) companies comprising the plurality. The Economic Freedom of the World Index lists Hong Kong as the freest economy, with a score of 8.58 based on data from 2022.

== Effects ==
Hong Kong's economy is often described as a premier global financial and logistics hub, with a low-tax and free-market structure, though assessments of its overall robustness vary among analysts.This include a sound banking system, virtually no public debt, a strong legal system, ample foreign exchange reserves with assets of US$481.6 billion represent over six times the currency in circulation or about 46 per cent of Hong Kong dollar M3 as at the end of March 2022, rigorous anti-corruption measures and close ties with mainland China. The Hong Kong Stock Exchange is a favourable destination for international firms and firms from mainland China to be listed, due to Hong Kong's highly internationalised and modernised financial industry. Additional advantages include the city's capital market in Asia, its size, regulations and available financial tools, which are comparable to London and New York City.

Hong Kong's gross domestic product had grown 180 times between 1961 and 1997. Also, the GDP per capita rose by 87 times within the same time frame. Its economy is slightly larger than Chile's or Romania's and its GDP per capita at purchasing power parity was the twelfth highest globally in 2023. By the latter measure, its GDP per capita was higher than those of the Netherlands, and slightly lower than Brunei. In 2009, Hong Kong's real economic growth fell by 2.8% as a result of the Great Recession.

By the late 20th century, Hong Kong was the seventh largest port in the world and second only to New York City and Rotterdam in terms of container throughput. Hong Kong is a full Member of the World Trade Organization. The Kwai Chung container complex was the largest in Asia, while Hong Kong shipping owners were second only to those of Greece in terms of total tonnage holdings in the world. The Hong Kong Stock Exchange is the sixth largest in the world, with a market capitalisation of about US$3.732 trillion.

Hong Kong has also had an abundant supply of labour from the regions nearby. A skilled labour force coupled with the adoption of modern British/Western business methods and technology ensured that opportunities for external trade, investment, and recruitment were maximised. Prices and wages in Hong Kong are relatively flexible, depending on the performance and stability of the economy of Hong Kong.

Hong Kong raises revenues from the sale and taxation of land and through attracting international businesses to provide capital for its public finance, due to its low tax policy. According to Hawksford, Hong Kong is considered by some sources to be among the more attractive business environments in East Asia, in terms of attracting foreign direct investment (FDI), depending on the assumptions, timeframe and metrics applied. In 2024, Hong Kong was the third largest recipient of FDI in the world.

Hong Kong ranked fourth on the Tax Justice Network's 2011 Financial Secrecy Index. The Hong Kong Government was the fourth highest ranked Asian government in the World Economic Forum's Network Readiness Index (NRI), a measure of a government's information and communication technologies in 2016, and ranked 13th globally.

Hong Kong was ranked as the 15th most innovative territory in the 2025 Global Innovation Index, and stepped ahead to the 14th position in 2026; it was also ranked 3rd in the Global Financial Centres Index.

According to the Economic Freedom of the World 2024 report, Hong Kong emerged as the top-ranked region, excelling particularly in the domains of Freedom to Trade Internationally and Regulation.

== Since the 1997 handover ==
Since the 1997 handover, Hong Kong's economic future became far more exposed to the challenges of economic globalisation and the direct competition from cities in mainland China. In particular, Shanghai claimed to have a geographical advantage. The Shanghai municipal government dreamt of turning the city into China's main economic centre by as early as 2010.

Since the 1997 handover, Hong Kong's share of China's GDP has dropped from 18.4% to 2.1% in 2021. In 2021, the Housing Price Index was double of what it was in 1997, while the Real Wage Index was almost unchanged.

== Positive non-interventionism ==
Hong Kong's economic policy has often been cited by economists such as Milton Friedman and the Cato Institute as an example of laissez-faire capitalism, attributing the city's success to the government having a relatively low level of involvement in the economy. However, others have argued that the economic strategy is not at all adequately characterised by the term laissez-faire. They point out that there are still many ways in which the government is involved in the economy, some of which exceed the degree of involvement in other capitalist countries. For example, the government is involved in public works projects, healthcare, education, and social welfare spending. Further, although rates of taxation on personal and corporate income are low by international standards, unlike most other countries Hong Kong's government raises a significant portion of its revenues from land leases and land taxation. All land in Hong Kong is owned by the government and is leased to private developers and users on fixed terms, for fees which are paid to the state treasury. By restricting the sale of land leases, the Hong Kong government keeps the price of land at what some consider as artificially high prices and this allows the government to support public spending with a low tax rate on income and profit. Moreover, as demonstrated in the regulation of finance companies in the 1970s and 1980s, the principle of positive non-interventionism in practice involved the government intervening in markets, albeit often hesitantly and belatedly, when the public interest was perceived to be threatened. The concept evolved towards a policy of "when in doubt, do nothing" during this period of financial instability.

== Sectors ==
=== Banking and finance ===
Hong Kong is a leading global financial centre with a robust three-tier banking system (licensed banks, restricted licence banks and deposit-taking companies) regulated by the Hong Kong Monetary Authority (HKMA). It boasts the highest concentration of banking institutions, with 70 of the top 100 world banks operating there (HSBC, Bank of China (Hong Kong) and Standard Chartered) and the sector is a cornerstone of the economy, contributing 24.9% to GDP in 2023.

=== Education ===
Education in Hong Kong used to be largely modelled on that of the United Kingdom, particularly the English system. Since 2012, the overhaul of secondary school diploma has introduced changes to the number of school years as well as the two-tier general examinations. The DSE has replaced the old HKCEE (similar to the UK's GCSE) and the A-levels. Education policy in Hong Kong is overseen by the Education Bureau and the Social Welfare Department.

The academic year begins mid-year, usually starting in September.

=== Healthcare ===
Hong Kong's medical infrastructure consists of a mixed medical economy, with 12 private hospitals and 43 public hospitals. Hong Kong has high standards of medical practice. It has contributed to the development of liver transplantation, being the first in the world to carry out an adult to adult live donor liver transplant in 1993. Both public and private hospitals in Hong Kong have partnered with the Australian Council on Healthcare Standards (ACHS) for international healthcare accreditation. There are also polyclinics that offer primary care services, including dentistry.

The Li Ka Shing Faculty of Medicine of the University of Hong Kong and Faculty of Medicine of The Chinese University of Hong Kong are the two major tertiary institutions nurturing medical professionals in Hong Kong. Every year, over 200 medical undergraduates complete their studies and join the medical workforce. For postgraduate medical education, The Hong Kong Academy of Medicine is an independent institution with the statutory power to organise, monitor, assess and accredit all medical specialist training and to oversee the provision of continuing medical education in Hong Kong. In addition, The Royal College of Physicians and Surgeons of Canada has also accredited the postgraduate medical education (1994–present) in Hong Kong and allowed these graduates from the Hong Kong Academy of Medicine seeking RCPSC Certification and practising in Canada.

A study published in 2016 found that around 8% of the population had avoided seeing a doctor because they couldn't afford to.

=== Housing ===
Housing in Hong Kong varies by location and income. More than 7 million people live on about 1,108 km^{2} (427 mi^{2}) of land in the region, making it one of the densest places in the world.

Hong Kong has one of the most developed mortgage market in Asia. Mortgage loans account for 25-30% of bank loans in Hong Kong. Land ownership and land restrictions by the government risk inefficiencies with housing supply and demand. In 1998 there was a property price collapse; from 1997 to 2003 Hong Kong residential property prices fell by 61% following the Asian economic crisis. Investigations show that there is a distinct correlation between lending and property prices and that the influence is thought to have come from the property prices to the bank credit rather than the other direction. Hong Kong is known for having one of the most expensive real estate sector in the world, in both commercial and residential space. As property value increase, the tendency with Hong Kong property owners is to leave property vacant whilst waiting for a better time to sell it on. This subsequently raises the vacancy rate. (For example, in 2007, the vacancy rate for residential properties in Hong Kong was close to 2.5% with an 11% increase in the value of residential properties).

=== Retail and hospitality ===
Shopping is a popular social activity in Hong Kong, where basic items for sale do not draw any duties, sales taxation, or import taxation. Only specific import goods such as alcohol, tobacco, perfumes, cosmetics, cars and petroleum products have associated taxes. For companies, there is a 17.5% corporate tax, which is lower than international standards. Shoppers reportedly spend over US$5.2 billion a month in Hong Kong shops.

Hong Kong's proximity to manufacturing plants in China, as well as its status as a free port, allow it to sell and transport a wide variety of goods. There are few restrictions on merchandise vending, and therefore items such as realistic toy weapons are available. The two main shopping seasons are at Christmas and the Chinese New Year.

The region is unique in the sense that it is official languages are both Cantonese and English, which enables a healthy tourist trade with English-speaking customers as bilingual sales tags and salespeople are common, especially in tourist areas. The MTR subway and effective taxi service also facilitate Hong Kong's busy shopping industry.

=== Telecommunications and media ===
Communications in Hong Kong includes a wide-ranging and sophisticated network of radio, television, telephone, Internet, and related online services, reflecting Hong Kong's thriving commerce and international importance.

There are some 60 online newspapers (in various languages, but mostly in Traditional Chinese) and the numbers of online periodicals run into the hundreds. The territory is in addition the East and Southeast Asian headquarters for most of the major international communications and media services.

Broadcast media and news is provided by several television and radio companies, one of which is government-run. Television provides the major source of news and entertainment for the average family. Chinese television programs are produced for both local and overseas markets.

Hong Kong also ranks as an important centre of publishing and printing: numerous books are published yearly for local consumption, several leading foreign publishers have their regional offices in Hong Kong, and many international magazines are printed in the territory.

=== Tourism ===
The tourism industry has been an important part of the economy of Hong Kong since it shifted to a service sector model in the late 1980s and early 1990s. There has been a sharp increase of domestic tourists from mainland China following the introduction of the Individual Visit Scheme (IVS) in 2003.

=== Transport ===
Hong Kong has a highly developed transport network, encompassing both public and private transport. According to the Hong Kong Government's Travel Characteristics Survey, over 90% of daily journeys are on public transport, the highest rate in the world. However, in 2014, the Transport Advisory Committee issued a report on the worsening congestion problem in Hong Kong and pointed at the excessive growth of private cars over the past 10–15 years.

The Octopus card, a smart electronic money payment system, was introduced in September 1997 to provide an alternative to traditional banknotes and coins. Available for purchase and renewal in every stop of the Mass Transit Railway (MTR) system and at a select few ferry customer service centers, the Octopus card is a non-touch payment system which allows payment not only for public transport (such as trains, buses, trams, ferries and minibuses), but also at parking meters, convenience stores, supermarkets, select restaurants and most vending machines.

=== Water supply and sanitation ===
Water supply and sanitation in Hong Kong is characterized by water import, reservoirs, and treatment infrastructure. Though multiple measures were made throughout its history, providing an adequate water supply for Hong Kong has met with numerous challenges because the region has few natural lakes and rivers, inadequate groundwater sources (inaccessible in most cases due to the hard granite bedrock found in most areas in the territory), a high population density, and extreme seasonable variations in rainfall. Thus nearly 80 percent of water demand is met by importing water from mainland China, based on a longstanding contract. In addition, freshwater demand is curtailed by the use of seawater for toilet flushing, using a separate distribution system. Hong Kong also uses reservoirs and water treatment plants to maintain its source of clean water.

== Economic data ==
Development of real GDP per capita in Hong Kong, Taiwan and mainland China

The following table shows the main economic indicators in 1980–2021 (with IMF staff estimates in 2022–2027). Inflation below 5% is in green.

Year	GDP (in Bil. US$PPP)	GDP per capita (in US$ PPP)	GDP (in Bil. US$nominal)	GDP per capita (in US$ nominal)	GDP growth (real)	Inflation rate (in Percent)	Unemployment (in Percent)	Government debt (in % of GDP)
1980	36.1	7,130.7	28.9	5,704.0	▲10.3%	▲4.4%	3.8%	n/a
1981	▲43.1	▲8,325.5	▲31.1	▲5,995.2	▲9.2%	▲9.5%	▲3.9%	n/a
1982	▲47.1	▲8,956.7	▲32.3	▲6,139.0	▲2.9%	▲11.0%	▼3.5%	n/a
1983	▲51.9	▲9,701.3	▼29.9	▼5,590.2	▲6.0%	▲9.9%	▲4.4%	n/a
1984	▲59.2	▲10,892.1	▲33.5	▲6,170.5	▲10.0%	▲8.5%	▼3.9%	n/a
1985	▲61.5	▲11,173.8	▲35.7	▲6,490.4	▲0.7%	▲3.6%	▼3.2%	n/a
1986	▲69.7	▲12,515.9	▲41.1	▲7,380.1	▲11.1%	▲3.6%	▼2.8%	n/a
1987	▲80.9	▲14,415.0	▲50.6	▲9,015.2	▲13.4%	▲5.7%	▼1.7%	n/a
1988	▲90.9	▲16,032.8	▲59.7	▲10,527.5	▲8.5%	▲7.8%	▼1.4%	n/a
1989	▲96.6	▲16,877.5	▲68.8	▲12,012.6	▲2.3%	▲10.2%	▼1.1%	n/a
1990	▲104.1	▲18,099.3	▲76.9	▲13,374.3	▲3.8%	▲10.3%	▲1.3%	n/a
1991	▲113.8	▲19,563.0	▲89.0	▲15,297.6	▲5.7%	▲11.2%	▲1.8%	n/a
1992	▲123.6	▲20,995.4	▲104.3	▲17,710.5	▲6.2%	▲9.6%	▲2.0%	n/a
1993	▲134.4	▲22,405.6	▲120.4	▲20,065.7	▲6.2%	▲8.8%	2.0%	n/a
1994	▲145.5	▲23,784.5	▲135.8	▲22,194.0	▲6.0%	▲8.8%	▼1.9%	n/a
1995	▲152.1	▲24,262.2	▲144.7	▲23,070.5	▲2.4%	▲9.0%	▲3.2%	n/a
1996	▲161.5	▲24,975.4	▲159.7	▲24,699.0	▲4.3%	▲6.3%	▼2.8%	n/a
1997	▲172.7	▲26,496.4	▲177.3	▲27,214.6	▲5.1%	▲5.8%	▼2.2%	n/a
1998	▼164.3	▼24,962.9	▼168.9	▼25,649.1	▼-5.9%	▲2.8%	▲4.7%	n/a
1999	▲170.8	▲25,737.3	▼165.7	▼24,969.0	▲2.5%	▲-4.0%	▲6.3%	n/a
2000	▲188.1	▲28,025.5	▲171.6	▲25,574.5	▲7.7%	▲-3.7%	▼4.9%	n/a
2001	▲193.4	▲28,737.1	▼169.4	▼25,166.9	▲0.6%	▲-1.6%	▲5.1%	n/a
2002	▲199.7	▲29,688.3	▼166.3	▼24,731.1	▲1.7%	▲-3.0%	▲7.3%	n/a
2003	▲209.8	▲31,022.4	▼161.4	▼23,856.5	▲3.1%	▲-2.6%	▲7.9%	n/a
2004	▲234.2	▲34,456.0	▲169.1	▲24,873.9	▲8.7%	▲-0.4%	▼6.8%	1.9%
2005	▲259.4	▲37,938.2	▲181.6	▲26,551.8	▲7.4%	▲0.9%	▼5.6%	▼1.7%
2006	▲286.2	▲41,456.1	▲193.5	▲28,028.2	▲7.0%	▲2.0%	▼4.8%	▼1.4%
2007	▲313.0	▲45,106.1	▲211.6	▲30,494.6	▲6.5%	▲2.0%	▼4.0%	▼1.2%
2008	▲325.8	▲46,777.4	▲219.3	▲31,487.9	▲2.1%	▲4.3%	▼3.5%	▼1.0%
2009	▼319.8	▼45,706.2	▼214.0	▼30,594.0	▼-2.5%	▲0.6%	▲5.3%	▼0.7%
2010	▲345.5	▲48,996.0	▲228.6	▲32,421.4	▲6.8%	▲2.3%	▼4.3%	▼0.6%
2011	▲369.7	▲51,998.8	▲248.5	▲34,955.1	▲4.8%	▲5.3%	▼3.4%	0.6%
2012	▲373.5	▲52,082.4	▲262.6	▲36,623.7	▲1.7%	▲4.1%	▼3.3%	▼0.5%
2013	▲385.4	▲53,453.6	▲275.7	▲38,233.4	▲3.1%	▲4.3%	▲3.4%	▼0.5%
2014	▲396.0	▲54,604.9	▲291.5	▲40,185.3	▲2.8%	▲4.4%	▼3.3%	▼0.1%
2015	▲411.3	▲56,266.9	▲309.4	▲42,325.4	▲2.4%	▲3.0%	▲3.3%	0.1%
2016	▲419.8	▲56,903.2	▲320.9	▲43,488.2	▲2.2%	▲2.4%	▲3.4%	0.1%
2017	▲442.4	▲59,667.9	▲341.3	▲46,025.7	▲3.8%	▲1.5%	▼3.1%	0.1%
2018	▲465.9	▲62,220.8	▲361.7	▲48,310.0	▲2.8%	▲2.4%	▼2.8%	0.1%
2019	▲466.3	▼61,999.4	▲363.1	▼48,274.9	▼-1.7%	▲2.9%	▲2.9%	▲0.3%
2020	▼441.0	▼59,380.4	▼344.9	▼46,443.6	▼-6.5%	▲0.3%	▲5.8%	▲1.0%
2021	▲488.5	▲65,980.6	▲369.2	▲49,865.4	▲6.3%	▲1.6%	▼5.2%	▲2.1%
2022	▲518.7	▲69,987.0	▼368.4	▼49,699.6	▼-0.9%	▲1.9%	▼4.5%	▲3.3%
2023	▲558.4	▲75,134.8	▲387.5	▲52,132.1	▲3.9%	▲2.4%	▼4.0%	▲4.3%
2024	▲587.1	▲78,651.5	▲406.7	▲54,494.0	▲3.0%	▲2.5%	▼3.7%	▲4.7%
2025	▲615.2	▲81,952.1	▲427.3	▲56,912.0	▲2.9%	▲2.5%	▼3.4%	▲4.8%
2026	▲644.9	▲85,404.0	▲449.4	▲59,514.7	▲2.9%	▲2.5%	▼3.1%	▼4.7%
2027	▲675.8	▲88,978.9	▲471.0	▲62,015.3	▲2.8%	▲2.5%	▼2.9%	▲5.4%

=== GDP ===
- GDP – nominal (2022): HK$2,818,046 million
- GDP – nominal in US$ (2022): $359,812 million
- GDP – real growth rate (2022): −3.5%
- GDP – per capita (2022): HK$383,611
- GDP – per capita US$ (2022): $48,980
- GDP – composition by sector (2022):
  - Financing and insurance: 21.3%
  - Import/export, wholesale and retail trades: 19.4%
  - Real estate, professional and business services: 9.1%
  - Public administration, social and personal services: 20.5%
  - Ownership of premises: 10.8%
  - Other Sectors: 18.9%

=== Labour ===
- Labour force (2022): 3.78 million -2.4% year-on-year
- Persons Engaged in various sectors (Dec 2022):
  - Social and personal services: 544,279
  - Import/export trade and wholesale: 679,161
  - Professional and business services: 384,439
  - Accommodation and food services: 258,304
  - Retail: 246,424
  - Finance and insurance: 233,440
  - Human health and social work services: 217,867
  - Education: 209,448
- Unemployed (2022): 163,100 4.3%
- Underemployed (2022): 88,100 2.3%

=== 2022–2023 fiscal year budget ===
- Total Revenues: HK$715.9 billion
- Total Expenditures: HK$807.3 billion
- Deficit: HK$91.4 billion
- Government debt at 31 March 2022: HK$56.68 billion

=== Trade ===
Exports of Hong Kong by product category (2019) Chemical products Transportation Machines Mineral products Plastics and rubbers Metals Foodstuffs Precious metals Textiles Instruments Animal products Vegetable products Paper goods Footwear and headwear Miscellaneous Stone and glass Wood products Animal and vegetable bi-products Animal hides Arts and antiques Weapons

Selective data in HK$ for Main Countries/Territories (2022)

- Total Trade: $9,459.1 billion −7.9% year-on-year, trade balance −$347.1 billion
  - With mainland China: $4,648.4 billion (49.1% share), −13.7% year-on-year
  - With Taiwan: $741.6 billion (7.8% share), +7.3% year-on-year
  - With the United States: $502.1 billion (5.3% share), −2.8% year-on-year
  - With Singapore: $481.2 billion (5.1% share), −0.5% year-on-year
  - With South Korea: $371.2 billion (3.9% share), −7.0% year-on-year
  - With Japan: $345.3 billion (3.7% share), −11.4% year-on-year
  - With Vietnam: $256.3 billion (2.7% share), +16.0% year-on-year
  - With India: $252.4 billion (2.7% share), +17.7% year-on-year
- Imports: $4,927.5 billion −7.2% year-on-year
  - From mainland China: $2,077.7 billion (42.2% share), −14.6% year-on-year
  - From Taiwan: $587.4 billion (11.9% share), +7.3% year-on-year
  - From Singapore: $398.5 billion (8.1% share), −3.7% year-on-year
  - From South Korea: $289.8 billion (5.9% share), −10.7% year-on-year
  - From Japan: $242.8 billion (4.9% share), −10.4% year-on-year
  - From the United States: $209.4 billion (4.3% share), +1.3% year-on-year
  - From Malaysia: $176.9 billion (3.6% share), +6.1% year-on-year
  - From Vietnam: $143.9 billion (2.9% share), +22.3% year-on-year
- Exports: $4,531.7 billion −8.6% year-on-year
  - To mainland China: $2,570.8 billion (56.7% share), −12.9% year-on-year
  - To the United States: $292.7 billion (6.5% share), −5.5% year-on-year
  - To India: $171.7 billion (3.8% share), +29.0% year-on-year
  - To Taiwan: $154.2 billion (3.4% share), +7.2% year-on-year
  - To Vietnam: $112.4 billion (2.5% share), +8.9% year-on-year
  - To Japan: $102.5 billion (2.3% share), −13.8% year-on-year
  - To the United Arab Emirates : $95.0 billion (2.1% share), +35.3% year-on-year
  - To Singapore: $82.9 billion (1.8% share), +18.6% year-on-year

==== Trade with Macau ====
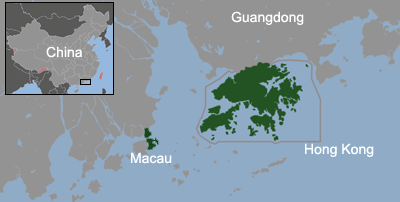
Location of Hong Kong and Macau

As at 2015, Macau is Hong Kong's second largest export destination, occupying 6.1% of Hong Kong's total exports. The amount of export totaled US$8.4B, with broadcasting equipment, jewelry, and precious metal watches as the major products. On the other hand, Hong Kong is Macau's largest export destination. Totaled USD 774M, with precious metal watches, jewelry, trunks and cases as the major trading products, the exports to the Hong Kong forms 53% of Macau's total exports. Since 2018, Hong Kong and Macau have been connected via road by the Hong Kong–Zhuhai–Macau Bridge.

==== Trade with Guangdong ====
The Guangdong–Hong Kong–Macao Greater Bay Area (GBA) is a high-level strategic city cluster comprising two Special Administrative Regions (Hong Kong and Macao) and nine cities in Guangdong Province. With a population exceeding 87 million and a GDP over RMB14.5 trillion (2024), it serves as a combined technology, financial, and logistics innovation hub. Bordering Hong Kong, the mainland Chinese province provides manufacturing capabilities, while Hong Kong acts as a financial, transportation, and professional services hub which boosted the commercialization of technology.

== Poverty ==
The international poverty line is a monetary threshold under which an individual is considered to be living in poverty. This threshold is calculated using Purchasing Power Parity. According to the World Bank, the international poverty line was most recently updated in October 2015, in which it was increased from $1.25 per day to $1.90 per day using the value of 2011 dollars. Raising this threshold helps account for changes in costs of living, which directly effects individuals ability to obtain basic necessities across countries.

Recent figures show that 1.37 million people are living below the poverty line and struggling to survive on HK$4,000 (US$510) per month for a one-person household, HK$9,800 for a two-person household earning, and HK$15,000 or a three-person household. The poverty rate in Hong Kong hit a high of 20.1%, but recent efforts by government programs have lowered this number to 14.7%.

In December 2012, the Commission on Poverty (CoP) was reinstated to prevent and alleviate poverty with three primary functions; analyze the poverty situation, assist policy formulation and to assess policy effectiveness. Cash handouts have been credited with alleviating much of the poverty, but the extent in which poverty has been alleviated is still questionable. Although cash handouts raise households above the poverty line, they are still struggling to meet certain standards as the cost of living in Hong Kong steadily increases.

Coupled with these cash payments, statutory minimum wage is set to increase for a second time in the past 10 years. Statutory Minimum Wage (SMW) came into existence on 1 May 2011 and the SMW rate has been HK$34.5 per hour since May 2017. The Legislative Council in Hong Kong most recently approved the revision on the SMW rate to increase to HK$37.5 per hour, effective 1 May 2019. Although the total statistics for Hong Kong show declining poverty, child poverty increased .3 percentage points from 2017 to 2018, up to a total of 23.1%, as a result of larger households due to children staying with their elderly parents. With economic growth projected to slow in the coming years, poverty becomes an increasingly pressing issue.

One of the largest issues affecting low income families is the availability of affordable housing. Over the past decade, residential Hong Kong property prices have increased close to 242%, with growth finally starting to decelerate in 2019. Considering housing is a basic necessity, prices have continuously increased while disposable incomes remain virtually unchanged. As the amount of affordable housing diminishes, it has become much harder for families to find homes in their home country. Public housing programs have been implemented by the government, but delayed construction and growing waitlists have not helped to the extent they planned for. Recent results from a Hong Kong think tank show that by 2022, the average citizen could wait up to 6 years for public housing. Evidence shows that the availability of affordable housing has declined, forcing households to spend more on shelter and less on other necessities. These issues can lead to worse living conditions and imbalanced diets, both of which pose problems beyond just financial well-being.

== Financial markets ==
=== Stock exchange ===
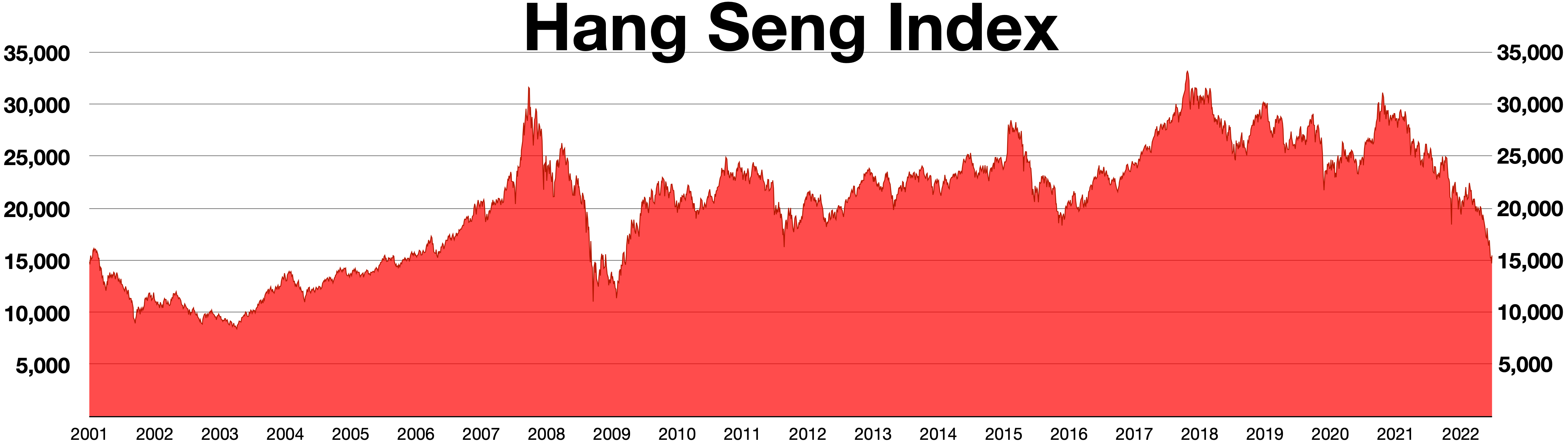
Hang Seng Index 2001 - 2022

The Hong Kong Stock Exchange is the sixth largest in the world, with a market capitalisation of about US$3.732 trillion as of mid-2017. In 2006, the value of initial public offerings (IPO) conducted in Hong Kong was second highest in the world after London. In 2009, Hong Kong raised 22 percent of IPO capital, becoming the largest centre of IPOs in the world. The exchange is the world's 10th largest by turnover and third largest in China. (Note: After Shenzhen and Shanghai)

=== Bond market ===
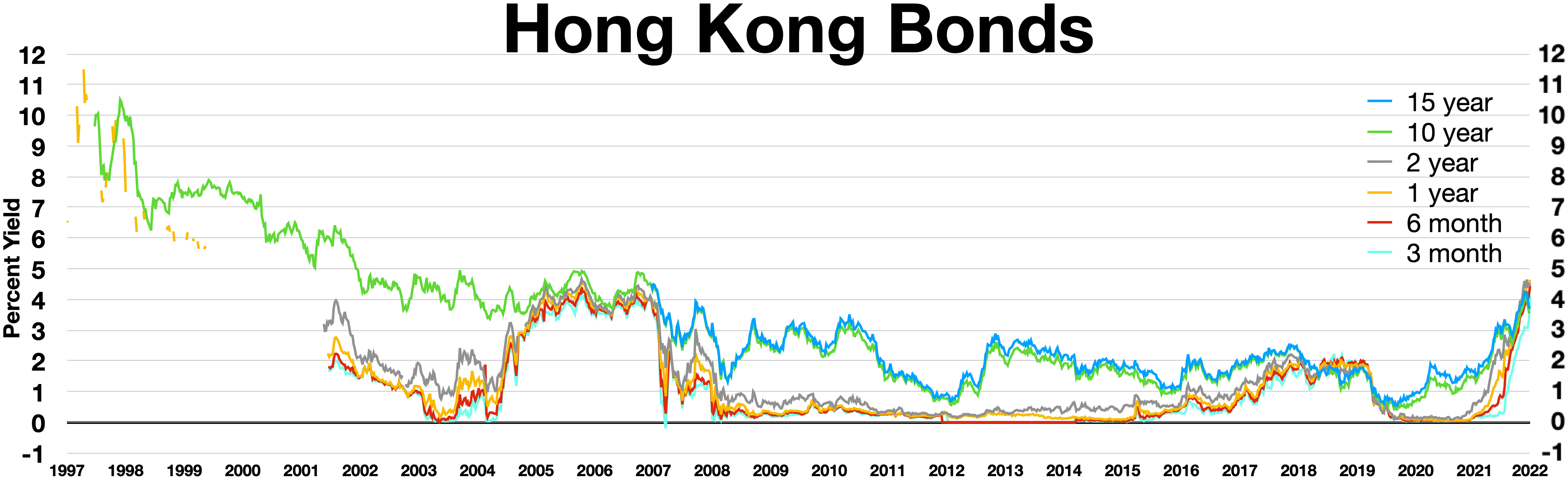
Hong Kong bonds 15 year 10 year 2 year 1 year 6 month 3 month

=== Exchange rates ===
Current HKD exchange rates
From Google Finance:	AUD CAD CHF CNY EUR GBP JPY USD TWD KRW INR
From Yahoo! Finance:	AUD CAD CHF CNY EUR GBP JPY USD TWD KRW INR
From XE.com:	AUD CAD CHF CNY EUR GBP JPY USD TWD KRW INR
From OANDA:	AUD CAD CHF CNY EUR GBP JPY USD TWD KRW INR

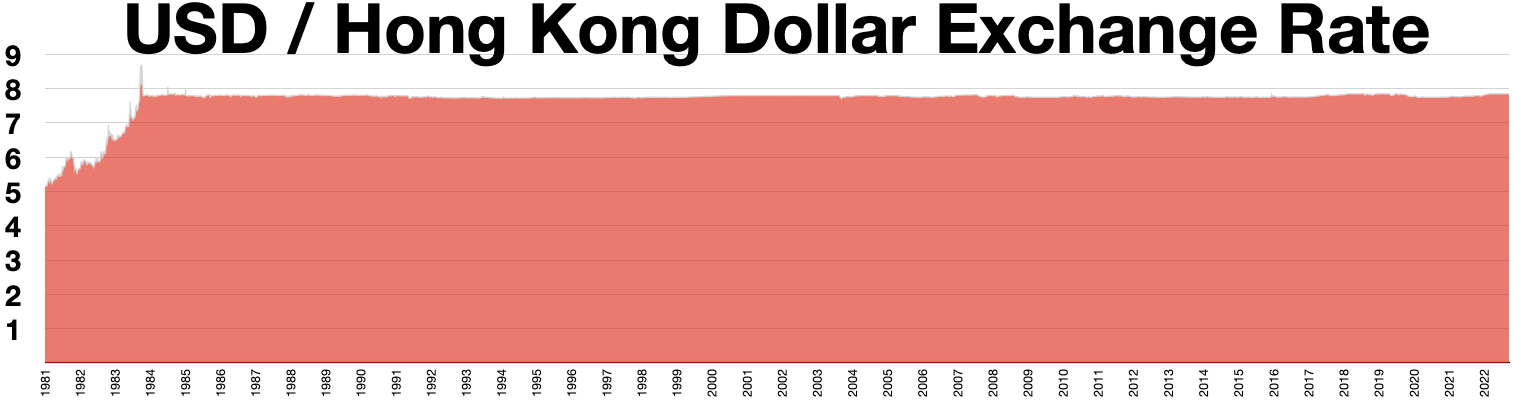
USD / Hong Kong Dollar exchange rate

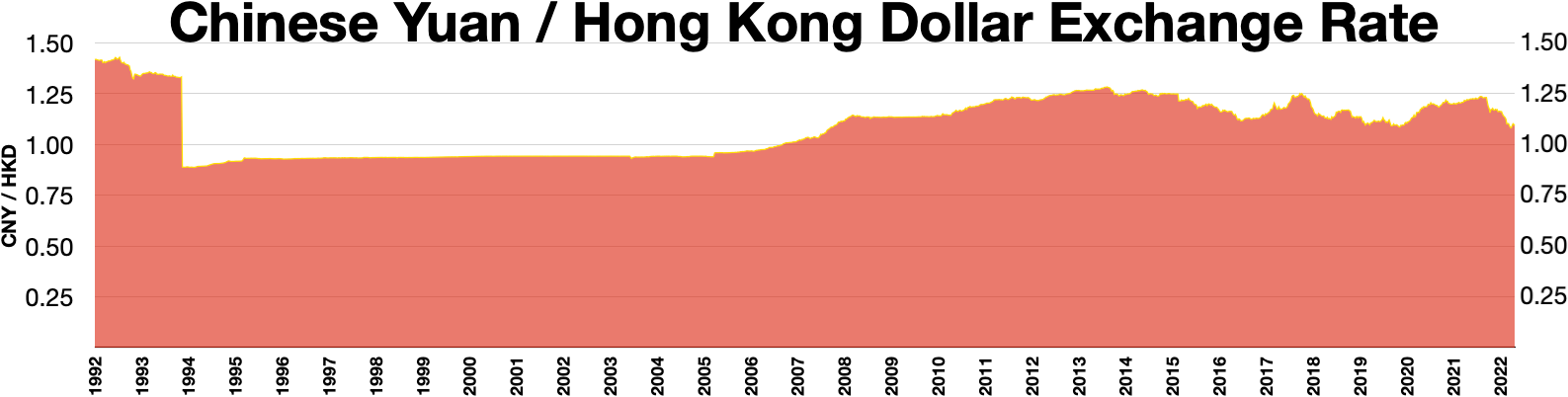
Chinese Yuan / Hong Kong Dollar exchange rate

== See also ==
- List of companies of Hong Kong
- List of Hong Kong people by net worth
- State enterprises in Hong Kong
- Four Asian Tigers
- Bamboo network
- China Circle
- Economy of Macau
- Economy of China
- Economy of East Asia
- Agriculture in Hong Kong
- Corruption in Hong Kong
- Employment in Hong Kong
- Four big families of Hong Kong
- Gambling in Hong Kong
- Goods and services tax (Hong Kong)
- Hong Kong Confederation of Trade Unions
- Hong Kong Economic and Trade Office
- Hong Kong Export Credit Insurance Corporation
- Hong Kong Federation of Trade Unions
- Hong Kong Trade Development Council
- Immigration to Hong Kong
- Individual Visit Scheme
- John James Cowperthwaite
- Mainland and HK Closer Economic Partnership Arrangement (CEPA)
- Mandatory Provident Fund
- Manufacturing in Hong Kong
- Mining in Hong Kong
- Parallel trading in Hong Kong
- Positive non-interventionism
- Public factory estates in Hong Kong
- Taipan (corporate title)
- Taxation in Hong Kong
- Tax haven
- The Hongs
- Nylonkong
- Poverty Campaign: Speak Up
- Seamen's strike of 1922
- Shanghai-Hong Kong Stock Connect
- Shenzhen-Hong Kong Stock Connect
- Vietnamese businesses in Hong Kong
- Yellow economic circle
- Free market
