= AII =

AII may refer to:

- Agence de l'innovation industrielle (est. 2005) a French governmental agency which supports technological projects
- Assyrian Neo-Aramaic (ISO 639-3 language code: aii)
- Ali-Sabieh Airport (IATA airport code: AII; ICAO airport code: HDAS), Ali-Sabieh, Djibouti
- Air Integra (ICAO airline code: AII); see List of airline codes (A)
- Ajmer Junction railway station (rail code: AII), Jaipur Road, Patel Nagar, Topdara, Ajmer district, Rajasthan, India
- Angiotensin II (angiotensin 2)
- AII amacrine cells
- American Idol (season 1), AI-I

== See also ==
- AI1 (disambiguation)
- A11 (disambiguation)
- All (disambiguation)
- Ail (disambiguation)
- Ali (disambiguation)
- AL1 (disambiguation)
- II (disambiguation)
- AA (disambiguation)
- AI (disambiguation)
- A2 (disambiguation)
- IAI (disambiguation)
- IIA (disambiguation)
