= A2 =

A2, A02, A002, A², A.II or A-2 may refer to:

== Arts and media ==
=== Gaming ===
- A2 Secret of the Slavers Stockade, a module in the Scourge of the Slave Lords series for Dungeons & Dragons
- Final Fantasy Tactics A2: Grimoire of the Rift
- YoRHa Type A No. 2, or A2, a character from the video game Nier: Automata

=== Music ===
- A due, a musical term often abbreviated to a2
- A2, a rock band that performed the song "Chosen One" in the video game Shadow the Hedgehog

=== Television ===
- A2 (remote television production), a person who manages audio equipment
- A2 Stereo or Zweikanalton, a television broadcasting system
- "A2 Teema", a panel discussion episode of Ajankohtainen kakkonen, a Finnish television series
- Antenne 2, former name (1975–1992) of French national television station France 2, commonly abbreviated "A2"

=== Other media ===
- Radio Station A2, a radio station in Lithuania
- A II, a painting by László Moholy-Nagy, painted in 1924
- A2 (theater), a person who manages audio equipment

== Language ==
- Biu-Mandara A.2 languages, an Afro-Asiatic family of languages spoken in Nigeria
- A2, a second language level in the IB Group 2 subjects
- A2, a level in the Common European Framework of Reference for Languages

== Military ==
- A-2 jacket, a leather flight jacket
- A2, the military staff designation in the continental staff system for air force headquarters staff concerned with intelligence and security
- A 2, Göta Artillery Regiment designation, a former Swedish Army artillery regiment

== Sport ==
- A2 (classification), an amputee sport classification
- HEBA A2, a Greek basketball league
- A2 volleyball league (Portugal)
- A2, an Italian Baseball League
- A2, an Italian Volleyball League
- A2, a grade in climbing

== Science and technology ==
=== Biology and medicine ===
==== Genes and proteins ====
- A-box 2 of insulin gene
- HLA-A2, a human MHC HLA-A serotype gene
- Ectodysplasin A2 receptor, a protein that in humans is encoded by the EDA2R gene
- Alpha-2 adrenergic receptor
- Annexin A2, a protein
- Apolipoprotein A-II, a protein
- Phospholipase A2, an enzyme
- Prokaryotic phospholipase A2, an enzyme
- Hemoglobin A2, a protein
- Proanthocyanidin A2, an A type proanthocyanidin
- Urea transporter A2, a protein
- A2, a variant of blood groups alleles A in the ABO blood group system
- A2, a subfamily of rhodopsin-like receptors

==== Medicine ====
- ATC code A02 Drugs for acid related disorders, a subgroup of the Anatomical Therapeutic Chemical Classification System
- Brachydactyly type A2, a disease
- Noradrenergic cell group A2

==== Other uses in biology and medicine ====
- British NVC community A2 (Lemna minor community), a plant community
- A2, the second anal vein in the Comstock-Needham system of insect wing segment naming

=== Computing ===
- A-2 (programming language), a follow-on to the A-0 System used on UNIVAC I
- A2 (operating system), software to run a computer

=== Electronics ===
- DiMAGE A2, a digital camera produced by Minolta
- IBM A2, an IBM processor used in its supercomputers
- Cowon A2, a portable multimedia player from Cowon

=== Weapons ===
- A2 (rocket), a German rocket design (1934)
- AUG A2 Commando, a variant of the Austrian Steyr AUG rifle
- M16A2 rifle, a variant of the M16 rifle of the US Army
- AR-15A2, a variant of the Colt AR-15 rifle
- M16A2 mine, a variant of the M16 mine of the US Army
- Polaris A-2, a variant of the Polaris missile of the US Navy

=== Other technology ===
- A-2 tool steel, an air-hardening SAE grade of tool steel
- A2 or SAE 304, a grade of stainless steel for fasteners
- A2 milk, a trademark of the A2 Corporation
- Lely Astronaut A2, the second version of the Astronaut robot manufactured by Lely

== Transportation ==
=== Air ===
- A-2 Savage or AJ Savage, an aircraft
- Abrial A-2 Vautour, a French sailplane built in 1925
- Antonov A-2, a Soviet glider
- Breda A.2, a 1921 Italian aircraft
- Fokker A.II, a German aircraft
- Nikol A-2, 1939 a prototype of a Polish amphibious flying boat
- Pfalz A.II, a German Idflieg A-class designation aircraft
- Reaction Engines A2, a design study for a hypersonic airliner under development
- Cielos Airlines's IATA code
- North American AJ Savage carrier-launched bomber (US Navy alphanumeric code "A-2")
- A2, a Botswana aircraft registration code

=== Rail ===
- A2-class Melbourne tram
- Bavarian A II, an 1847 German steam locomotive model
- Ceylon Government Railway A2, a class of steam locomotives
- LNER Class A2, a class of steam locomotives
- LNER Peppercorn Class A2, a class of steam locomotives
- LNER Thompson Class A2, 3 classes of Pacific locomotives
- Milwaukee Road class A2, a 1901 4-4-2 type steam locomotive
- SP&S Class A2, an 1887 steam locomotives class
- Victorian Railways A2 class, a 1907 Australian steam locomotive
- PRR A2, a Pennsylvania Railroad locomotive classification
- Prussian A 2, a Prussian railbus model

=== Road ===
- List of A2 roads
- Anadol A2, a 1970 Turkish car
- Arrows A2, a 1979 British racing car
- Audi A2, a 1999 automobile
- Merzario A2; see template:F1 cars 1979
- Route A2 (WMATA), a bus route operated by the Washington Metropolitan Area Transit Authority
- Audi Quattro A2, a 1984 rally car evolution of the Audi Quattro

=== Sea ===
- HMS A2, a Royal Navy A-class submarine
- Type A2 submarine, a submarine of the Imperial Japanese Navy during World War II
- T2-SE-A2, a type of oil tanker constructed and produced in large quantities in the US during World War II
- Sea Area A2, as defined under the GMDSS system

=== Space ===
- Saturn A-2, a 1959 American rocket
- A-002, the third abort test of the Apollo spacecraft
- Aussat (Optus) A2, a 1985 Australian satellite

=== Tanks ===
- M1A2, a version of the American M1 Abrams tank
- M60A2, a version of the American M60 Patton tank

== Other uses ==
- DIN4102 A2, a flammability rating for materials ~98% noncombustible
- A2-level, an education qualification in England, Wales and Northern Ireland
- A2 milk, a trademark of the A2 Corporation
- A-2 visa, a document given to officials representing a foreign government inside the US
- Agence de l'innovation industrielle (AII), a French governmental agency for technological projects
- Ann Arbor, Michigan, often referred to as A2 or A^{2}
- Bird's Opening's Encyclopaedia of Chess Openings code
- A2, an international standard paper size
- A2, a UK Town and Country Planning use class
- Sea Area A2, a GMDSS system area

== See also ==
- 2A (disambiguation)
