= 2A =

2A or II-A may refer to:

== Roads ==
- List of highways numbered 2A

== Science ==
- 2A self-cleaving peptides
- Alpha-2A adrenergic receptor
- IARC group 2A
- Keratin 2A
- Transcription factor II A

== Other ==
- Deutsche Bahn, IATA designator
- Second Amendment (disambiguation)
  - Second Amendment to the United States Constitution, that protects right to keep and bear arms
- Stalag II-A
- Telecom 2A, a satellite
- the number of the French department Corse-du-Sud
- a strain of the bacterium Lactobacillus sakei
- 2A, a school size classification used by the University Interscholastic League in Texas, US

== See also ==
- A2 (disambiguation)
- IIA (disambiguation)
