= Employment in Hong Kong =

This article gives detailed information on the employment situation in Hong Kong.

== Overview ==
Hong Kong has an area of 1,106 square kilometres and a population of about 7,413,070 {2021 Hong Kong Census}. Despite its small size, Hong Kong is currently ranked the 15th largest exporting country in the world as of 2008. The total value of visible trade amounted to $3,548.2 billion in 2003, and exports totalled $362.1Bn in 2008. During the period of 2004 to 2007, the gross domestic product (GDP) grew at an average annual rate of 7.3% in real terms, to HK$1,627.5 billion (US$208.7 billion) in 2007. Per capita GDP reached HK$235,134 (US$30,157).

At the end of 2007, 3.46 million of the 3.65 million labour force were employed full-time, 117,800 were unemployed and 75,500 were considered under-employed. The unemployment rate averaged 4.1% in 2007, the fourth straight year of decline. It has since then increased to 5.3% by 2009. In 2015, this has decreased to 3.4%. In 2022, the unemployment rate was 4.1%.

== Labour legislation and labour standards ==
The momentum in improving working conditions, Occupational Safety and health and employees' rights and benefits has been kept up through an extensive programme of labour legislation. Some 42 pieces of legislation were enacted between 1997 and 2001. More are in the pipeline. Hong Kong aims at applying relevant International labour standards as the local circumstances allow. As of 28 April 2000, Hong Kong is following 7 Conventions, exceeding most countries in the region.

== Working conditions ==
The Employment Ordinance provides the framework for a comprehensive code of employment. It governs the payment of wages, the termination of employment contracts and the operation of employment agencies. The law provides statutory holidays with pay, sick leave, maternity protection, rest days, paid annual leave and employment protection for employees. All employees have statutory protection against anti-union discrimination. The law also provides for severance pay to workers made redundant, and long service payment to workers with long service who are dismissed for reasons other than redundancy, or on disciplinary grounds, who die in service, or who resign on grounds of ill health or old age. Employees who are owed wages, wages in lieu of notice and/or severance payments by insolvent employers may apply for ex-gratia payment from the Protection of Wages on Insolvency Fund which is financed by an annual levy on business registration certificates. The Employment of Children Regulations prohibit the employment of children aged under 15 in all industrial undertakings. Subject to certain protective restrictions, children aged 13 and 14 who are attending school may take up part-time employment in the non-industrial sectors. The Employment of Young Persons (Industry) Regulations govern the employment conditions of young persons aged 15 to 17 in industrial undertakings. These young persons are not allowed to work more than eight hours a day and 48 hours a week. Overtime work for them is prohibited. Eight special enforcement teams of labour inspectors are responsible for monitoring employers' compliance with various labour legislation to safeguard the rights and benefits of local and imported workers.

== Trade unions and industrial disputes ==
Hong Kong people have the right and freedom to form and join trade unions. At the end of December As of 2001 there were 654 registered trade unions, consisting of 610 employees' unions, 25 employers' associations and 19 mixed organisations of employers and employees. The total estimated membership was around 683,000. Hong Kong has an outstanding record of industrial peace. In 2001, it lost 0.26 working day per 1,000 workers. During the year, the Labour Department dealt with 31,698 labour problems, most of which were grievances involving claims of wages in arrears, wages in lieu of notice and holiday pay. There was one work stoppage, and the number of working days lost was 700.

== Minor employment claims adjudication board ==
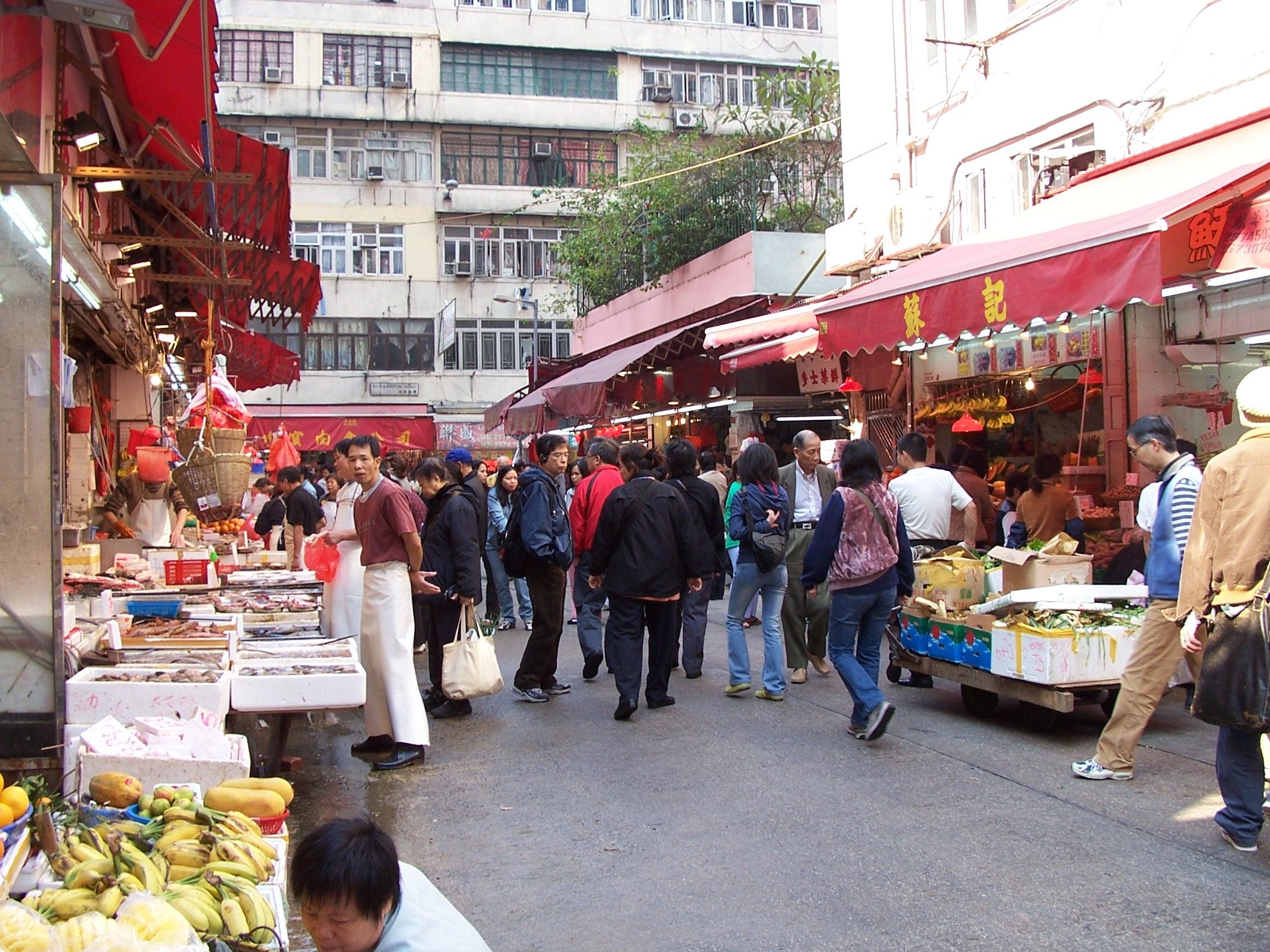
One source of employment in Hong Kong is street markets.

To speed up the settlement of minor employment claims, the Minor Employment Claims Adjudication Board was set up in the Labour Department in 1994 for the adjudication of rights claimed under the Employment Ordinance and in accordance with individual employment contracts. The board hears claims by not more than 10 claimants for a sum not exceeding $8,000 per claimant. Hearings are conducted in public and procedures are simple and informal. Claims by more than 10 claimants, or more than $8,000 per claimant, are heard by the Labour Tribunal.

== Labour Tribunal ==
The tribunal comes under the Judiciary and provides a quick, inexpensive and informal forum for settling labour disputes. It hears employment claims for a sum of money arising from the breach of a term of a contract of employment or the failure to comply with the Employment Ordinance or the Apprenticeship Ordinance.

== Occupational safety and health ==
The Occupational Safety Officers of the Labour Department promote and protect the health and safety of employees in the industrial and non-industrial sectors. To reduce accidents and guard against ill-health, efforts are focused on legislative control, safety training, education and promotion. Under the Occupational Safety and Health Ordinance and the Factories and Industrial Undertakings Ordinance, 31 sets of regulations have been made to cover various aspects of hazardous activities in factories, building and engineering construction sites, restaurants, catering establishments, commercial premises and other workplaces. As of 2001, 126,470 inspections and 12,500 accident investigations were conducted. A total of 2 660 prosecutions were taken out with fines totalling $32.3 million. In 2001, 597 training courses on safety legislation for 6,391 people and 218 tailor-made briefing sessions for 6,874 employees in private and public sector organisations were given. Safety and health publications were distributed to members of the public through various outlets and 241 publication stands placed in major shopping centres, housing estates, clinics, transport stations, public utility service counters and government offices. The Occupational Safety Charter, setting out the rights of employees to enjoy a safe working environment and the employers' obligations to reduce the risk of accidents, remains a major promotion programme and as at the end of 2001, 558 organisations, including employer and employee bodies, have subscribed voluntarily to the charter. Five major publicity campaigns were launched in 2001, including a safety award scheme to promote safety in the catering industry, a programme to promote a greater awareness of occupational safety and health among small and medium enterprises, a safety award scheme to promote safety in the construction industry, a campaign to promote the Factories and Industrial Undertakings (Safety Management) Regulation and the Factories and Industrial Undertakings (Loadshifting Machinery) Regulation, and production of two television Announcement in Public Interests and four radio Announcement in Public Interests.

== Employees compensation ==
Under the Employees' Compensation Ordinance, an employer is liable to pay compensation to an employee who suffers personal injury arising out of and in the course of employment, or to eligible family members of an employee who is killed in an accident at work. All employers are required to have valid employees' compensation insurance policies to cover their liabilities both under the ordinance and at common law. The Employees' Compensation Ordinance is administered by the Employees' Compensation Division of the Labour Department, which handled 201 fatal accident cases and 67,540 non-fatal cases in 2001. Among these non-fatal cases, 10,722 were minor injury cases with sick leave not exceeding three days. The division also provides administrative support to the Employees' Compensation Assessment Board which assess the percentage of permanent loss of earning capacity suffered by injured employees. The Pneumoconiosis Compensation Office offers assistance to persons who have contracted pneumoconiosis or in case of their death their family members to obtain compensation from the Pneumoconiosis Compensation Fund Board which is financed by a levy on the construction and quarrying industries.

== Finding an employment in Hong Kong ==
For employers and job-seekers, there are several ways to find an employment in Hong Kong, either through public channels provided by the Hong Kong Government, NGOs in Hong Kong, and student affairs offices of university, or private channels like employment agencies, apps, magazines, newspapers, and leaflets. Shops among Hong Kong may advertise their vacancies on their windows directly.

For those who are not permanent residents of Hong Kong, they need to seek a suitable visa from the Immigration Department before starting their employment in Hong Kong. Some visa applications may require proof from the employer, such as an employment contract. On the other hand, it is worth to note that not all kinds of visa issued by the Immigration Department will make the visa holder become eligible to be employed in Hong Kong, for example, a visa for visit or a visa for transit in Hong Kong. Employers in Hong Kong, who want to employ a non-permanent Hong Kong resident, they have to inspect the job-seekers' valid travel documents to ensure that they are free to take up any employment in Hong Kong without the Director of Immigration's prior permission and have not breached any condition of stay. To employ a person permitted to remain on visitor, student, employment condition or a person whose travel document is endorsed with a condition of stay that "Employment is not permitted", requires prior approval from the Director of Immigration.

=== Public services for finding an employment in Hong Kong ===
The Labour Department provides free services for both employers and job-seekers. An employer, either from Hong Kong or even outside Hong Kong, can advertise its vacancies by submitting information to Job Vacancy Processing Centre of the Labour Department. After the vetting procedures complete, the job information will then be shown in the following channel maintained by the Labour Department: the website of Interactive Employment Service (iES), on the job cards at the Job Centres and Recruitment Centres, on the Interactive Employment Service Mobile App (iES Mobile App), Vacancies Search Terminals among Hong Kong. Jobs opening to applicants attaining a university degree certificate are also available on the Higher Education Employment Information e-Platform (HEEIP) website maintained by the Labour Department. Apart from the channels aforementioned, job-seekers can find job information through the Telephone Employment Service Centre of the Labour Department.

Through the Job Matching Programme, the Job Centres provide briefing, intensive job-matching and counselling services to unemployed job-seekers. Employers and job-seekers may also make use of the Interactive Employment Service (iES) provided by the department on the web to submit vacancy information or register for placement service. All vacancies received by the department are posted on the web site for public viewing. Members of the public may access the iES with internet connected personal computers, public computer facilities at district offices, community halls, public libraries and post offices, and public information kiosks distributed over Hong Kong.

To improve its operating environment and enhance the quality of service, the Labour Department has re-provisioned its Job Centres to include such facilities as briefing room, reading area and audio-visual corner for job-seekers. Telephones, fax machines and computers with internet connection are also available to facilitate job-seekers to search suitable jobs on the Internet, prepare resumes and make direct job applications with employers.

=== Private services for finding a job in Hong Kong ===
There are plenty of private channels for finding a job in Hong Kong, such as websites, apps, newspapers, magazines, employment agencies.

== Employment assistance to people with disabilities ==
The Selective Placement Division provides free specialised employment assistance to people with disabilities seeking open employment. The service caters for the visually impaired, hearing impaired, physically handicapped, chronically ill, mentally handicapped and ex-mentally ill. During 2001, the division recorded 4,128 registrations and achieved 2,348 placements.

== Employment distribution ==
Total employment in the third quarter of 2007 was 3.52 million. The employment distribution among various industry sectors was as follows:

Industry Sector	Employment (mn)	Distribution (%)
Wholesale, retail, trade, catering, hotels	1,056,855	30.1%
Finance, insurance, real estate, business services	509,257	14.5%
Community social and personal services	465,356	13.3%
Transport, storage, communications	189,812	5.4%
Manufacturing	155,968	4.4%
Civil Service	153,768	4.4%
Other	1,073,500	30.6%
Total employment	3,512,100	98.3%

(Note: There may be a slight discrepancy between the sum of individual items and the total as shown in the table owing to rounding)

Hong Kong's economy has historically been driven by its status as one of the major transport and logistic hubs for East Asia. In more recent years, Hong Kong has seen other sectors become more important in its economy. Financial and banking services have become a much larger part of the high-end economy in Hong Kong and one of the major drivers of economic growth. The growth of these businesses has helped Hong Kong keep its position as one of the world's top economies.

== Wages ==
A minimum wage law was passed in Hong Kong in July 2010. It requires the Chief Executive of Hong Kong to propose a minimum wage level, which he will do for the first time in November 2010; the Legislative Council will either approve or reject the amount. The law does not give the Legislative Council the power to amend the amount, and it is not applicable to foreign domestic helpers, who, under legislation specifically governing the employment of foreign domestic helpers, earn a minimum of HK$3,580 per month. The wage level prevailing is essentially the result of interplay of supply and demand. Wages are usually calculated on hourly, daily, monthly, or piece rates. In September As of 2007, the average monthly wage rate for the supervisory, technical, clerical and miscellaneous non-production workers was HK$11,712. Based on the wage indexes, the average wage rate for this group of workers rose by 1.8% per annum in 1995–2007, and by 1.5% per annum in real terms. The small difference is due to severe consumer price deflation. The overall average daily wage for the workers on public works construction projects was HK$565.60 at the end of 2007.

In November 2010, legislators of the Hong Kong SAR Government agreed to set a minimum wage level of HK$28.00 (UK£2.29 or US$3.60) per hour, which came into force on 1 May 2011.
Effective 1 May 2013, this was raised to HK$30.00 per hour.
Effective 1 May 2015, the minimum wage was raised to HK$32.50 per hour.
Effective 1 May 2017, the minimum wage was raised to HK$34.50 per hour.
Effective 1 May 2019, the minimum wage was raised to HK$37.50 per hour.

Effective 1 May 2023, the minimum wage was raised to HK$40 per hour

== See also ==
- Economy of Hong Kong
