= IIA =

IIA or Iia may refer to:

- Independence of irrelevant alternatives
- Indian Institute of Architects
- Indian Institute of Astrophysics
- Indianapolis International Airport
- Institute of Internal Auditors
- Information Industry Association
- International Investment Agreement
- Interactive Internet Activities, operational policy of the US Department of Defense
- Islamabad International Airport
- IIa or II-a, a subtype of Type II supernova
- A rating in the Hong Kong motion picture rating system
- Iia, Estonia, village in Estonia

== See also ==
- 2A (disambiguation), including a list of topics named II-A, etc.
