= AII amacrine cells =

Vision-related neuron type in mammals

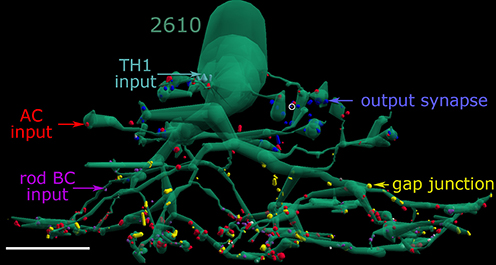
AII cell partnerships. AII cell 2610 with its rod bipolar cell input (magenta), amacrine cell input synaptic input (red), coupling sites (yellow), TH1 cell input (cyan), and glycinergic synaptic output (blue) dimensionally mapped onto its surface. Small white dots are adherens junctions. A single visible OFF cone BC ribbon is marked with a white circle. Scale, 10 μm.

AII (A2) amacrine cells are a subtype of amacrine cells. Amacrine cells are neurons that exist in the retina of mammals to assist in interpreting photoreceptive signals. AII amacrine cells serve the critical role of transferring light signals from rod photoreceptors to the retinal ganglion cells (which contain the axons of the optic nerve).

The AII amacrine cells are unique because they work primarily with the vertical transmission of information, meaning they connect the bipolar and ganglion cells. Other amacrine cells primarily assist with horizontal pathways, meaning they connect similar types of neurons. Amacrine II cells also work very similarly to rod photoreceptors in terms of threshold (amount of stimulation needed to begin performing), saturation level (how densely they exist, and where), and spectral sensitivities (how sensitive the cell is to changes in stimulation levels). However, the Amacrine II cell works faster than the rod photoreceptors.

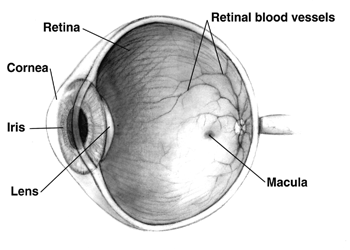
A diagram of the retina of the eye.

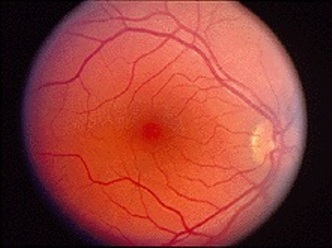
A photograph of the retina of the human eye. (د.مصطفى الجزار, License link)

Morphology

AII amacrine cells are round or oval, and include dendrites which connect together to create a systematic mosaic. They have two main forms, which differ in their dendritic trees (dendritic formations). The first form is made of one dendrite with multiple short, thin arms that end in circular appendages. The second form has multiple thin dendrites with attached spines, and extensive branching. Amacrine II cells are found most densely in the central retina, but are found in the surrounding retinal areas as well.

Development

The study of the development of amacrine cells is relatively recent. A recent study found that, in mice, amacrine cells develop during the Peri-Eye-Opening Period (during 7-28 days post birth). During this time, the cells are developing dendrites and dendritic spines, shifting resting membrane potentials (RMPs), developing synaptic activity, and developing Potassium currents (K+).

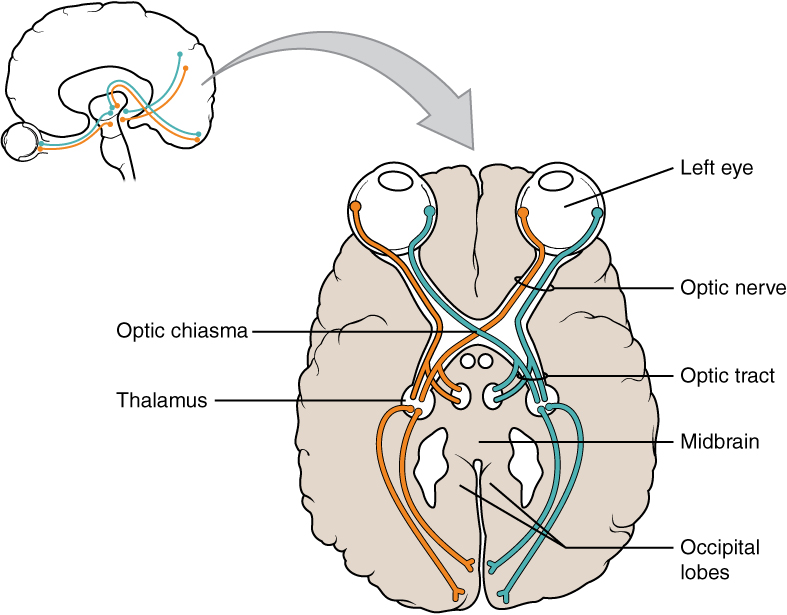
A visual of the placement and use of the optic nerves. (OpenStax Textbook, Anatomy and Physiology, License Link)

The Retina

- The retina is a region of tissue at the back of the eye. It is light sensitive, which is why the mentioned light activated cells are located here. It is responsible for collecting light information through the eye, turning it to electric information, and transmitting it to the optic nerve.

The Optic Nerve

- The optic nerve is a bundle of nerves that transmits one-way electrical information from the retina to the brain. Each eye has an optic nerve.

Classical Rod Pathway

To understand the role of AII amacrine cells in the mammalian retina, we must understand the Classical Rod Pathway. This can be summarized as follows:

- Scotopic lighting is dim lighting. The mammalian eye primarily utilizes its rod shaped photoreceptors to interact with this light.
  - Photoreceptors contain photopigments. These units contain one protein, known as opsin, and one molecule, known as a chromophore. The chromophore of vertebrate animals is retinal, a form of Vitamin A.
    - Humans have four types of opsin. One exists in rod photoreceptors and is responsible for low light vision (as in the classical rod pathway). The rest exist in cone photoreceptors and work together to provide colored vision. The amino acid composition of each opsin causes them to be used specifically when the environment calls for them.
      The conformation change of retinal, caused by light.
- When photons of light reach the retina, they are absorbed by the chromophore (retinal). This causes a change of configuration in retinal, which causes a signaling pathway that results in the closure of membrane sodium channels. This change triggers the cell membrane to become charged negatively through the process of hyperpolarization.
  - As soon as a photon of light stimulates a rod, the AII amacrine cells are stimulated.
- The chromophore and opsin detach, reverting the chromophore to its original conformation.
  - This step is the main difference between this vertebrate pathway and the invertebrate pathway. In invertebrates, the chromophore is rarely reused. Instead, new chromophores are generated for the next use.
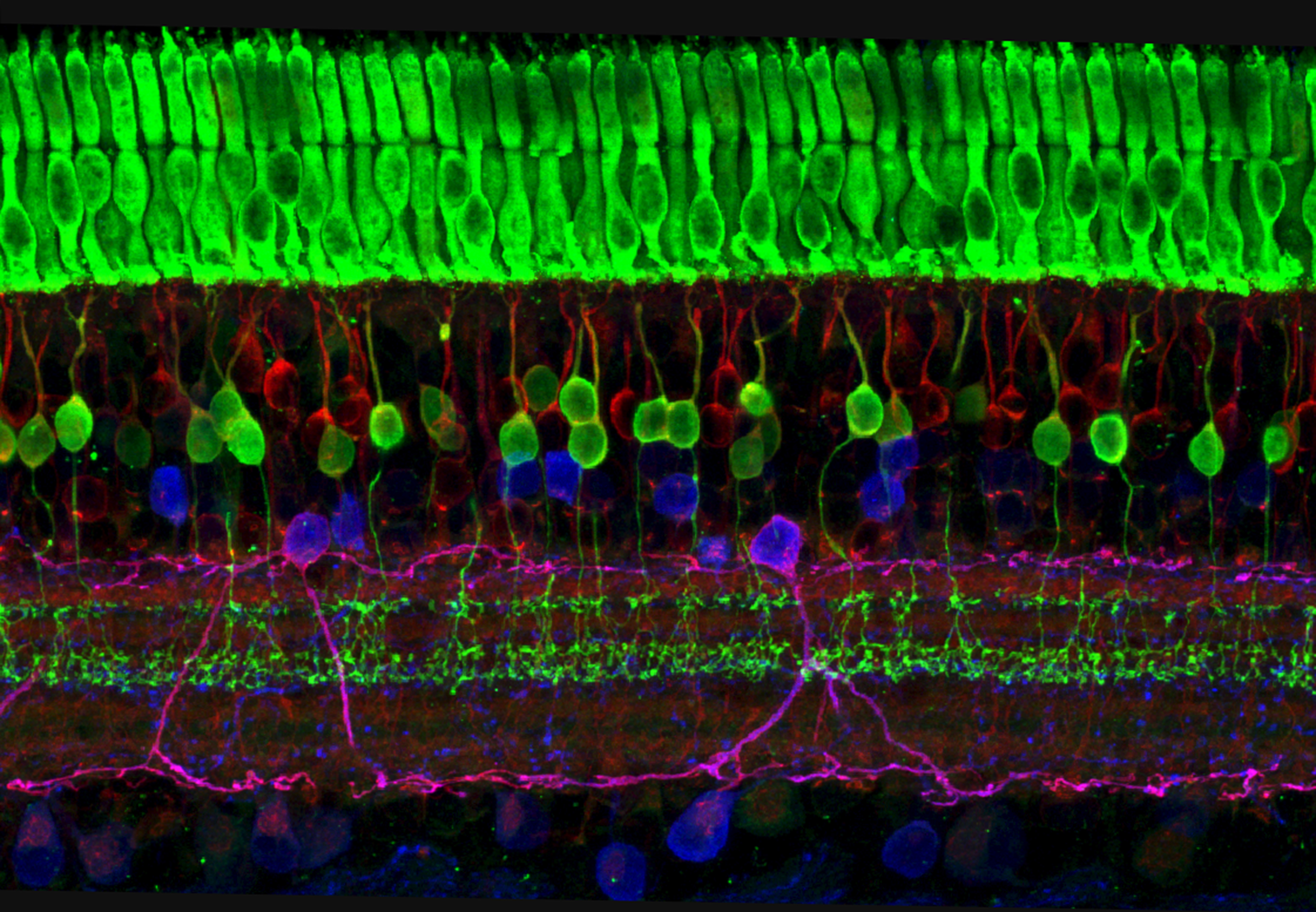
    The three-layered network that carries photoreceptor information to the optic nerve. Photoreceptors are shown at the top, and the optic nerve is shown at the bottom.
- Now, the information must travel from the photoreceptors to the optic nerve. This process takes place in a three layered network of synapsing retinal cells. The photoreceptors exist at the back of the retina. The photoreceptors synapse (connect) with bipolar cells. The signals are transmitted along the network through the processes of depolarization and hyperpolarization. The photoreceptors first depolarize, meaning the cell becomes less negatively charged than its surroundings. This causes them to release glutamate, a neurotransmitter. Bipolar cells possess glutamate receptors, meaning they recognize the neurotransmitter and respond to the stimulus. They respond by hyperpolarizing, meaning their cells become more negative than their surroundings (opposite of photoreceptors). The bipolar cells then synapse with the ganglion cells that make up the optic nerve in the region known as the inner plexiform layer (IPL). When the system is 'ON', signals are interpreted by the inner half of the IPL. When the system is 'OFF', signals are interpreted by the outer half of the IPL. Bipolar, amacrine, and ganglion cells interact in both regions.
  - This is where the Amacrine II cells come into play. They assist in the transfer of information between the rod photoreceptors and the ganglion cells. These cells create a complex system that controls the connections between each layer, and ensures that the activity of these connections stays within acceptable bounds. This control system ensure that even when light is varying strongly, the system is not overwhelmed.
    - The Amacrine II cells also create contrast between signals, allowing them to be differentiated.
    - This system allows for small, but important, signals to be amplified, while large, but irrelevant signals, may be muted.
    - Multiple types of amacrine cells exist here, but only the Amacrine II cells form vertical pathways.
    - The amacrine cells were originally thought to be methodically placed in this system. However, it has been discovered that the placement of amacrine cells, especially amacrine II cells, to each other and to bipolar cells is largely random in most vertebrates. It is not yet known why this is. It is hypothesized that amacrine cells are able to migrate within the retina, causing a random formation. It is also hypothesized that the reasoning for the randomness is to promote more even coverage and connectivity that a rigid system would not allow.
  - The amacrine II cells transfer signals bidirectionally, allowing for impressive synchronization of responses from this network.
  - From this network, the bipolar cells each turn on or off to control the intensity of light perceived, and to contrast between colors.

Interconnectivity between Amacrine II cells

- Dopamine decreases the interconnectivity of Amacrine II cells.
- The base level of interconnectivity between Amacrine II cells is currently unknown, as different methods of study have produced different results. One model has suggested that each Amacrine II cell connects to an average of three others, while other models have suggested that each cell may be connected to between 20-300 others. Connectivity may depend on the region of the retina, or the level of light the region is accustomed to.

Note: A small proportion of rods contact the cone bipolar cells directly.
