= Ali-Sabieh Airport =

Airport in Ali Sabieh, Djibouti

- IATA: AII; ICAO: HDAS

Summary
- Airport type: Public
- Location: Ali Sabieh, Djibouti
- Coordinates: 11°9′0″N 42°43′0″E

Map
- Location of airport in Djibouti

Ali-Sabieh Airport (IATA: AII, ICAO: HDAS) is an airport serving the city of Ali-Sabieh in the Ali Sabieh Region of Djibouti.
