= Nikol A-2 =

Polish amphibious flying boat prototype

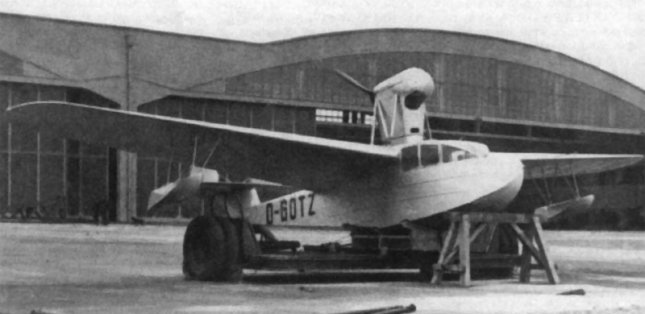

General information
- Type: Trainer amphibious flying boat
- Manufacturer: MDLot workshops
- Designer: Jerzy Nikol
- Status: Prototype
- Primary user: Polish Navy
- Number built: 1

History
- First flight: 4 March 1939

The Nikol A-2 was a small, amphibious aircraft designed and built in Poland in the 1930s. Only one was completed before World War II.

== Design and development ==
The Nikol A-2 had a very long gestation time; its designer, Jerzy Nicol started work on it in May 1929, shortly after his graduation from Warsaw Technical University, but the first flight was made almost ten years later on 4 March 1939. In 1934 the Polish Navy, with an interest in a catapult-launched amphibian for a new warship, contacted Nikol. By the end of 1935 wind tunnel tests had been completed and design calculations approved. Construction of the prototype began in 1936 in the Morski Dyon Lotniczy factory at Puck.

The all-wood, two-seat amphibian had a shoulder mounted cantilever wing built around two spars. Tapered in plan, the wing was plywood covered forward of the rear spar, forming watertight compartments to keep the aircraft afloat after severe hull damage. Behind the rear spar the wing was fabric covered.

The A-2 had a wooden fuselage with plywood skin, a single-step planing bottom and flat sides. It was internally divided by bulkheads into watertight compartments. There was a store for mooring gear in the nose and its two crew, provided with dual controls, were seated side-by-side ahead of the wing leading edge under a removable, hinged, framed cover. Behind them, a 89 kW (120 hp) de Havilland Gipsy Major four cylinder, inverted air-cooled inline engine was mounted in pusher configuration high over the wing on inward-leaning N-form struts, its low diameter, three-bladed propeller clearing the wing. The main fuel tankage was in the fuselage, with a reserve tank in the wing centre-section. The compartment under the trailing edge of the wing contained a luggage store, accessed via a watertight hatch.

Its ply-covered tailplane, mounted above the fuselage on a short pylon, was in-flight adjustable. Twin ply-covered, ground-adjustable fins were externally braced to it. Both elevator and rudders were balanced and fabric covered.

The A-2's landing gear was fitted with brakes and retracted into the wings.

Its first flight was made on 4 March 1939 and many test flights followed which confirmed good air and water handling, suggesting that the A-2 had a future with both naval and civil operators but because of the German invasion of Poland in September 1939 only the prototype flew. Its later history is uncertain: Cynk reports it as destroyed in the invasion but other sources suggest it survived the war, though without flying again. They claim that after the German invasion of Poland and the first unsuccessful air raid on a base in Puck on 1 September 1939, all Polish seaplanes, including the undamaged A-2 prototype, were evacuated from Puck to the naval harbour in Hel. It was slightly damaged due to further air raids, then captured by the Germans and taken to Travemünde for repairs and was later seen at other Polish bases.

== Operators ==
Germany

- Kriegsmarine captured the only prototype.

Poland

- Polish Navy

== Specifications ==
Data from J. Cynk, 1971 except where noted.

General characteristics

- Crew: Two
- Length: 7.7 m (25 ft 3 in)
- Wingspan: 12.6 m (41 ft 4 in)
- Height: 3.1 m (10 ft 2 in)
- Wing area: 21.5 m^{2} (231 sq ft)
- Empty weight: 630 kg (1,389 lb)
- Gross weight: 950 kg (2,094 lb)
- Powerplant: 1 × de Havilland Gipsy Major 4-cylinder, inverted air-cooled inline, 89–97 kW (120–130 hp)
- Propellers: 3-bladed wooden

Performance

- Maximum speed: 180 km/h (110 mph, 97 kn) at sea level. Other sources give speeds of about 150 km/h (93 mph; 81 kn).
- Cruise speed: 120 km/h (75 mph, 65 kn)
- Stall speed: 80 km/h (50 mph, 43 kn) minimum speed
- Range: 600 km (370 mi, 320 nmi)
- Service ceiling: 3,800 m (12,500 ft)
- Rate of climb: 2.4 m/s (470 ft/min)
