= Second Amendment (disambiguation) =

Second Amendment is part of the United States Bill of Rights, protecting the right of the people to keep and bear arms.

Second Amendment may also refer to:

- 1992 Colorado Amendment 2
- 1998 Hawaii Amendment 2, grants the Hawaii State Legislature the right to ban same-sex marriage
- 2000 Alabama Amendment 2, removed Alabama's ban on interracial marriage
- 2004 Missouri Amendment 2, bans same-sex marriage
- 2006 Idaho Amendment 2, bans same-sex marriage, civil unions and civil union equivalents
- 2008 Florida Amendment 2, bans same-sex marriage, civil unions and civil union equivalents
- Australian referendum, 1910 (State Debts), the second amendment to the Constitution of Australia
- Second Amendment to the Charter of Fundamental Rights and Freedoms of the Czech Republic, 2021 amendment which guarantees the right to armed self-defense
- Second Amendment of the Constitution of India, 1952 amendment which removed the upper population limit for parliamentary constituencies
- Second Amendment of the Constitution of Ireland, an omnibus amendment
- Second Amendment of the Constitution of South Africa, which made various technical changes
- Second Amendments, an American country-rock band that consisted of 5 members of the U.S. House of Representatives
