= AL1 =

AL1 may refer to:

- Four-Phase Systems AL1, 8-bit integrated circuit of an arithmetic logic unit and registers made by Four-Phase Systems in 1969
- AL1, original designation of British Rail Class 81
- A designation for main-belt asteroids
- AL1, a postcode district in the AL postcode area
- Al1, a 2017 EP by Seventeen

== See also ==
- Futurama#Language
