= Poverty Campaign: Speak Up =

- Genre: Televised forum, society show
- Starring: Hong Kong citizens
- Country of origin: Hong Kong
- Original language: Cantonese
- No. of episodes: 3

Production
- Running time: approx. 35 minutes

Original release
- Network: Television Broadcasts Limited
- Release: April 2008 – April 2008

Poverty Campaign: Speak Up (Chinese: 一百萬人的故事) is a society show on Hong Kong's TVB sponsored by general manager Stephen Chan. The title literally means "The story of a million people" as the show allows the poor to speak out about their poverty experience. Most complaints are against the way the Hong Kong government and major corporations treat them unfairly. Much of the theme is about the increasing gap between the rich and the poor.

== Episodes ==
- Poverty Campaign: Speak Up: Donation operations (一百萬人的故事 - 捐贈大行動)
- Poverty Campaign: Speak Up: Learn and care (一百萬人的故事 - 了解‧關懷)
- Poverty Campaign: Speak Up: Citizens open talk (一百萬人的故事 - 全民開講)

== Government problems ==
- Lack of minimum wages
- Uneven and unfair distribution of government wealth
- The government only listens to the rich, then make laws that favor the rich
- No actions are taken to help the poor
- Some comparisons are made for government standard before and after the 1997 handover

== Society problems ==
- Lowered living standards, instead of increasing
- Large families often supported by 1 working member in the household
- Growing numbers of children born below the poverty line

== Participants ==
An example of a participant of the show is Ah Ying. She was a toilet cleaner employed by contractors hired by the Food and Environmental Hygiene Department. Her hourly wage cut from HK$23.50 to HK$20, when her job title was changed to "washroom attendant" in 2005.

== Celebrities who have taken part ==
- Eason Chan
- Kelly Chan
- Eric Tsang
- Carina Lau
- Sandra Ng
- Stephen Chan
