= State enterprises in Hong Kong =

State enterprises in Hong Kong refer to commercial organizations that are either owned or significantly controlled by the Government of the Hong Kong Special Administrative Region (HKSAR). These enterprises operate across various sectors, contributing to the region's economic development and public service provision. The landscape of state enterprises in Hong Kong is shaped by the region's political and economic system, characterized by a high degree of autonomy under the "one country, two systems" principle.

== History ==
The concept of state enterprises in Hong Kong has evolved over time. During the British colonial era, several key public services were managed by government departments or statutory bodies. Post-1997, after the handover of Hong Kong to China, there was a strategic shift in the government's role in economic activities, balancing market freedom with public interests.

=== Pre-1997: British Colonial Era ===
During British colonial rule, several key public services in Hong Kong were managed by government departments or statutory bodies. This included utilities, transport, and postal services. The government's approach was primarily focused on providing essential services and infrastructure to support the growing economy and population.

Among the first entities was the MTR Corporation, established in 1975 as a government-owned entity to develop and operate Hong Kong's urban mass transit system. Hong Kong Post, dating back to the 19th century, functioned as a department within the colonial government, providing postal services aligned with British postal systems.

=== Post-1997: Transition and Reformation ===
The 1997 handover of Hong Kong to China marked a significant transition in the region's governance and economic management and in the years following the handover, there was a strategic shift towards corporatization and public-private partnerships. The aim was to leverage the efficiencies of the private sector while retaining key government objectives in public service provision and economic development. A major step in this transformation was the corporatization and public listing of some state enterprises. For instance, the MTR Corporation was corporatized in 2000, with the government retaining majority ownership but also allowing public investment through the Hong Kong Stock Exchange.

The 21st century saw further modernization and global integration of Hong Kong's state enterprises. They began adopting international standards in governance, transparency, and service delivery, reflecting Hong Kong's position as a global financial and business hub.

In recent years, state enterprises in Hong Kong have faced new challenges, including navigating the complexities of global economic fluctuations, technological advancements, and local socio-political dynamics. The government's role has been to ensure that these enterprises adapt to changing conditions while continuing to contribute to Hong Kong's economic stability and public service needs.

== Governance and regulation ==
State-owned enterprises in Hong Kong operate under specific regulatory acts called "Ordinance" that provide a legal framework for their functioning. These acts are tailored to the specific needs and objectives of each enterprise, ensuring that they adhere to standards of governance, transparency, and public accountability. These regulatory acts are complemented by broader legal frameworks, such as the Companies Ordinance and the Public Finance Ordinance, which provide general guidelines on corporate governance, financial management, and public accountability.

=== Mass Transit Railway (MTR) Corporation ===
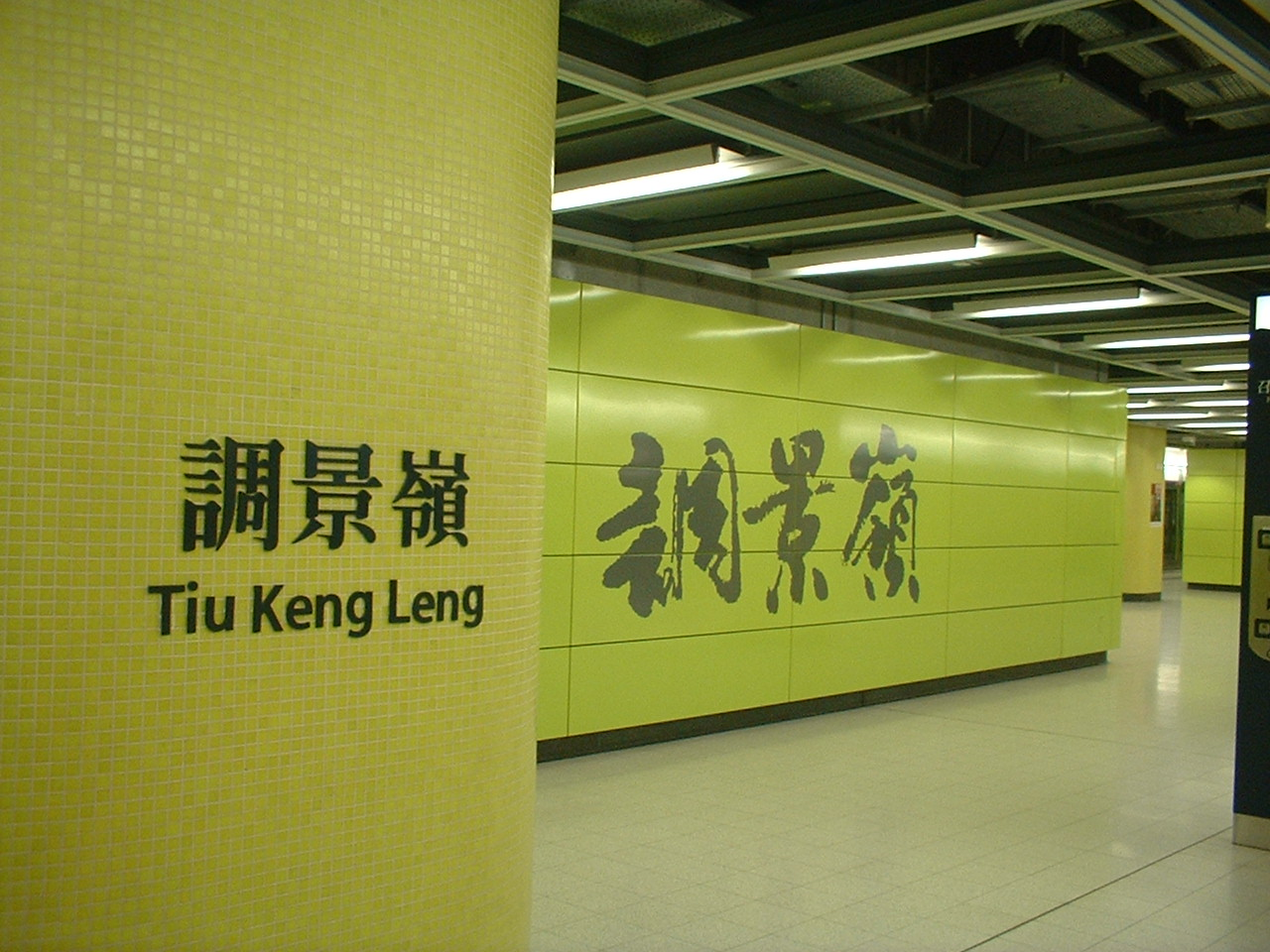
MTR Hong Kong station Tiu Keng Leng

The MTR Corporation, which manages Hong Kong's mass transit railway system, operates under the Mass Transit Railway Corporation Ordinance. This ordinance establishes the corporation's legal status, objectives, and powers. It outlines the company's responsibilities in managing and expanding the railway network, ensuring passenger safety, and maintaining service quality. The ordinance also includes provisions on land development rights associated with railway projects.

=== Hong Kong Post ===
Hong Kong Post, the region's official postal service, is governed by the Post Office Ordinance. The act regulates postal services in Hong Kong, encompassing aspects such as the handling of mail, postal charges, and licensing requirements for courier services. It also stipulates regulations regarding offenses and penalties related to postal services, such as mail tampering or fraud.

=== Urban Renewal Authority (URA) ===
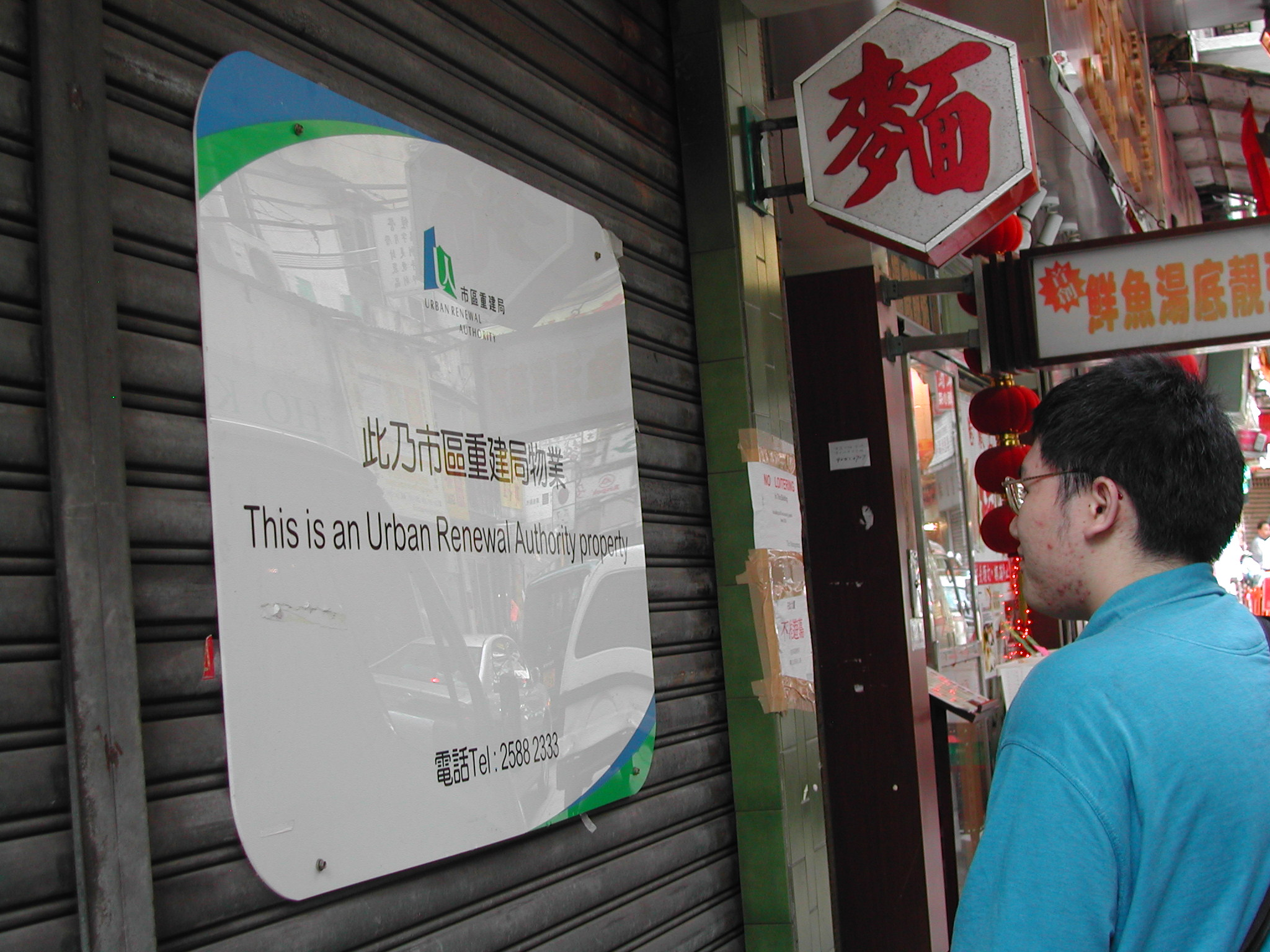
Urban Renewal Authority property

The Urban Renewal Authority Ordinance provides the legal framework for the Urban Renewal Authority. The URA is responsible for urban redevelopment projects aimed at improving living conditions in densely populated areas. The ordinance defines the URA's powers in terms of property acquisition, redevelopment, and compensation to affected residents. It also outlines the processes for public consultation and approval of redevelopment plans.
