= Prokaryotic phospholipase A2 =

Prokaryotic phospholipase A_{2}
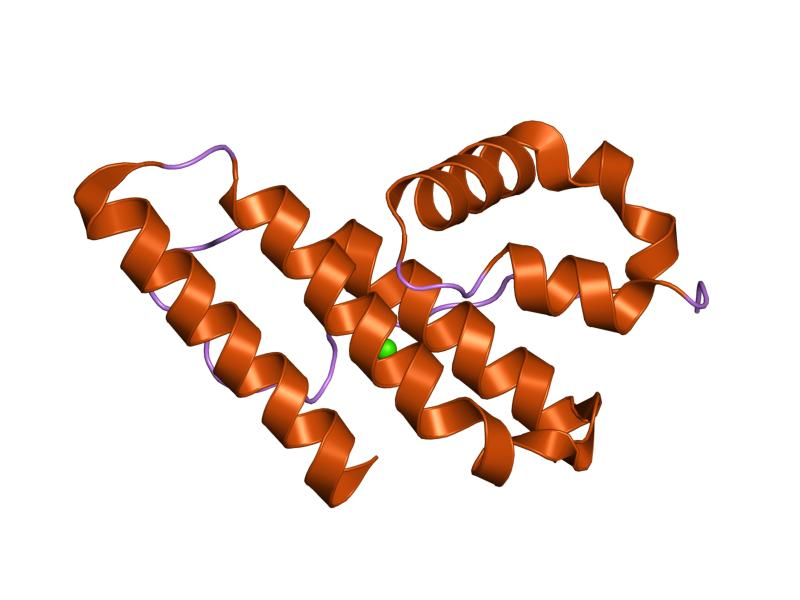
- Structure of prokaryotic phospholipase A_{2}.

Identifiers
- Symbol: Phospholip_A2_3
- Pfam: PF09056
- InterPro: IPR015141
- OPM superfamily: 82
- OPM protein: 1kp4
Available protein structures:
- Pfam: structures / ECOD
- PDB: RCSB PDB; PDBe; PDBj
- PDBsum: structure summary

The prokaryotic phospholipase A_{2} domain is found in bacterial and fungal phospholipases. It enables the liberation of fatty acids and lysophospholipid by hydrolyzing the 2-ester bond of 1,2-diacyl-3-sn-phosphoglycerides. The domain adopts an alpha-helical secondary structure, consisting of five alpha-helices and two helical segments.
