= Vietnamese businesses in Hong Kong =

Vietnamese businesses in Hong Kong are mainly run by Vietnamese, Chinese-Vietnamese and Overseas-Vietnamese coming to Hong Kong in different periods of time.

== Background ==
From 1977 to 1985, hundreds of thousands of Vietnamese people left Vietnam by wooden boats to other countries including Hong Kong to seek refuge in an escape of the persecution or forced re-education camp in Vietnam. Among the people leaving Vietnam, around half of them, being white-collar worker, represented a wide range of backgrounds which included urban and rural residents, and Chinese-Vietnamese. Starting from 1985 onwards, Chinese-Vietnamese, Amerasian and other rural and less-educated Vietnamese were released from re-education camps.

== Business environment ==
With the joint policy statement signed by the Securities & Futures Commission and the Hong Kong Exchanges and Clearing Ltd. on 7 March 2007, Professor KC Chan, Secretary for Financial Services & the Treasury of the HKSAR, encouraged Vietnamese enterprises to invest in Hong Kong in a conference held in Vietnam on 22 November 2007.

== Entry policy ==
Vietnamese people and citizens of some other countries, like Afghanistan and Nepal etc., who want to stay longer than the allowed free visa period to run a business in Hong Kong, are excluded under the General Employment Policy of the Immigration Guidelines of the Immigration Department.

On March 17, 2010, in response to a question concerning the immigration policy on Vietnamese people by Chan Kam-lam, a member of the Legislative Council of Hong Kong, Ambrose Lee Siu-kwong, the Secretary for Security of the HKSAR, once replied that such policy, as applied to the Vietnamese, was subject to the overall assessment of the country and the citizens, potential risks associated with the nationals and the overall security of Hong Kong for instance.

== Taxation ==
On 16 December 2008, the Hong Kong / Vietnam Comprehensive Double Taxation Agreement (CDTA) was signed by John Tsang Chun-wah, the Financial Secretary of the HKSAR, and Do Hoang Anh Tuan, Vice-Minister of Finance of Vietnam, in Hanoi.

Spokesman for the Hong Kong Government said such agreement would bring tax savings for both Vietnam and Hong Kong investors if they involve in bilateral trade and investment businesses.

Following the CDTA, the Order, which was made by the Chief Executive Council to implement the Avoidance of Double Taxation Agreement with Vietnam, was gazetted in Hong Kong on 30 April 2009. The order was then taken to be tabled in the Legislative Council of Hong Kong on 6 May 2009.

== Types of businesses ==
Catering

Distribution of Vietnamese Restaurant in Hong Kong (as of December 2010):

Region	Search Result	In operation
Hong Kong Island	126	75
Kowloon	131	82
New Territories	74	57
Lantau Island	5	5
total	336	219

Owner of Vietnamese Restaurant in Hong Kong (as of December 2010): Origin

Region	Vietnamese	Vietnamese Chinese	Hongkonger	Contacted
Hong Kong Island	1	2	10	13
Kowloon	5	4	8	17
New Territories	1	1	14	16
Lantau Island	/	/	/	/
total	7	7	32	46

Given inadequate research of the Vietnamese people in the territory either by academic researchers or policy researchers, few examples can be quoted and the cases presented below are, therefore, all primary resources obtained through direct interviews carried out in November 2010, with three corresponding owners of the businesses.

== Examples of Owners of Vietnamese Businesses in Hong Kong ==
Three informants were born and bred in Vietnam. Liu, one of the informants, is Chinese-Vietnamese; Annie and Michelle, the other two, are Vietnamese. Neither their mother tongue nor second language is Cantonese. They learned to speak Cantonese after they came to Hong Kong, and now they are able to master Cantonese fluently.

All of them established their business by using their savings. Lui and his wife, for instance, who have been selling authentic Vietnamese food for thirteen years, invested HK$648,300, which partially came from the couple’s savings while the rest from the brothers and sisters met in the church, in the restaurant which monthly profit varies from HK$3,000 to HK$10,000.

They engage in catering services, selling Vietnamese style food, such as Spring Roll while the business scale is small. Owning a restaurant in Hung Hom and Yuen Long respectively, Lui and Annie mainly serve the residents around. Michelle and her cousin, on the other hand, ran a snack shop in Tai Kok Tsui which opening hour was from 7am to 6pm and served the white-collar nearby.

While running the business they are not generally intended to attract Vietnamese in Hong Kong. Tastes of food are adjusted as they believe that Hong Kong customers do not adapt to heavy flavored food. Cost is an important consideration while running the business. Most of the ingredients are bought from local market. Michelle bought seasonings from Chinese herb shops and Thai seasoning stores. They also import spices from Vietnam that cannot be found in Hong Kong but are vital for the dishes.
