= China Circle =

Region with commercial and cultural ties to the Han Chinese

China Circle refers to the economic relationship between mainland China, Hong Kong, and Taiwan. With the fast-growing economy and the development of foreign investment in China, China has become the centre of the Asian market in the 1980s. The production chain in Taiwan and Hong Kong soon merged in China and formed a new economic network named "the Circle of China".

== Roles of the electronic industry ==
=== Japan ===
Japanese companies' investment is favoured in the China circle by the low operational costs. The investment was beneficial to the investor and the host. Most Japanese technological and electronics brands prioritized China for its products and technologies. The circle disclosed other opportunities in Hong Kong and Taiwan. It expanded due to the foreign corporations' development in these regions. The China Circle was entrusted as it protects the right of its members. Japanese companies were powerful in technological implementation; their collaboration with China Circle has gained enormous attention to attract other regions to join China Circle. Members within China Circle supported the union due to the benefit of electronics companies. China Circle was established when the circle members were economically disadvantaged. The countries understood the importance of having a union with clear economic goals. Japanese corporations in China meant that the region's technological status was to improve. These technological companies allowed the local people to interact with the corporations on different levels. The interaction between these Japanese electronics and the locals impacted their attitude towards technology and enabled knowledge exchange with other countries.

The cultural likeliness between Japan and China Circle members allowed Japanese companies to settle easily in the region. Most societal values connected Japanese entrepreneurs with different stakeholders in the China Circle market. The China Circle had the strongest bargaining power due to their collectiveness. The cultural similarity with Japan was an additional factor that enables the region to entice foreign brands. The Japanese entrepreneurs found most aspects of the region culture the same as Japanese cultural artefacts and belief systems. Therefore, Japanese brands did not struggle to ensure that their workers are culturally competent. Integrating the Chinese and Japanese workers allowed the Japanese brand to settle. In 2012, 144,000 Japanese companies were operating in China. The numbers do not include Japanese brands in Taiwan. Japanese companies that first settled in the China Circle gradually enticed other foreign brands in the region. The Japanese companies impacted the Chinese economy. The foreign commercial entities remitted their taxes. The presence of thousands of Japanese companies working in China depicts the Chinese market's flexibility to accommodate the Japanese business community in the country. The China Circle succeeded in making the right convenient. Similarly, the excellent rapport between different stakeholders the foreigners made China desirable. Cultural uniformity in some aspects made Japanese entrepreneurs feel at home while in China. The China Circle compromised nearby nations that have some similarities. Therefore, some Japanese tech companies extended their operations to other circle's regions. The Chinese technological industry was also in the infancy states. As a result, the foreign tech companies were integral in improving Chinese technological advancements. The culture, together with the goodwill from the people allowed Japanese brands to advance in the China Circle. The interaction with the circle enabled the entrepreneurs to consider other profitable regions within the China Circle.

=== USA ===
American electronic brands were successful in the international market. The achievements and favourable conditions in China allowed Americans to invest in these regions. Edge Electronic Group, Philips Electronics, and Electric Vehicles USA, Inc. are American electronic brands that accessed the Chinese market and the circle. American brands were powerful. The corporations became successful in China due to the favourable conditions in the region. American electronic brands in China remitted taxes to the government. The taxes from electronic brands invested in either country within the China Circle benefitted the circle members. American electronic corporations in the region employed the locals. Reduced unemployment rates help most households in Taiwan, Hong Kong, China. The three countries in the China Circle shared close geographical locations. It is easy for the circle to request foreign electronic corporations to invest within the member countries. Three countries benefited from the China Circle as it creates a rapport that enabled locals from circle members to migrate in search of employment. American and Japanese electronic brands improved cohesion among the circle members. As countries engaged one another when interacting with foreign investors, civilians within these nations were moving with the China Circle searching for jobs.

American electronics companies operating in the China Circle understood the opportunity in the China Circle. The opportunities in the market were unexplored and American companies’ arrival was a strategic decision. The exhibition of interest to invest in the China Circle indicated that the companies were aiming at all China Circle members. At that time, some electronics equipment was unavailable in the China Circle market. However, American electronics companies operating in the circle allowed the region's buyers to access other items that are unavailable in the domestic market. Similarly, American electronics organizations intensified pressure on the China Circle's markets. The buyer had alternatives that were missing before. Therefore, American brands continued to grow as other domestic companies. The circle members also improved their products' quality to avoid being rendered irrelevant. The Chinese market environment was suitable for foreign brands. Similarly, domestic companies started manufacturing electronics. The partnership between the local and American electronics allowed domestic electronics companies in the China Circle to advance their production levels.

The United States strong global status quo and perfect diplomatic relationship with China Circle member states favoured American electronics companies. The US was influential in international commercial engagements. Therefore, American companies willing to operate in the China Circle faced limited challenges in their efforts to access the China Circle. Besides, the impeccable diplomatic rapport between the US and the China Circle member states allowed the circle leadership to accept American electronics brands to operate within the China Circle. The trade engagement between the China Circle member states and the US through the US electronics brands opened up the American market to the circle member states. The US electronic companies were commercial entities that aimed profit maximization. Similarly, the China Circle intended to benefit from American electronics companies' presence in their region. Therefore, the interaction between the circle and US electronics brands benefitted all the involved parties. The China Circle was championing for the commercial benefit of all its members. The American electronics companies exploited different places within the China Circle to ensure that their affiliate companies are spread across the circle. China benefitted more than the other circle member states due to their authority in the region. The China Circle entanglement with the US electronics companies played a crucial role in instilling the Chinese current technological advancement. The domestic electronic companies borrowed a lot from the US electronic brands. The American electronics industry was more advanced than the Chinese electronics industry. Therefore, the foreign electronics companies' arrival in the China Circle member states was resourceful for the domestic companies.

== Economic growth model ==
The China circle's purpose is to improve the economic status of both the people and the country. The selected growth model displayed the circle's intent. It was engaging both internal and external players to protect the circle and members' interests. The China Circle realized that household is a crucial area to initiate economic growth. The circle improved per capita within the household in Hong Kong, Taiwan, and China. Focusing on the household allows the concerned parties to obtain crucial information about the family's economic statuses. China knew that the low operational costs in the region thrilled most investors. The China circle selected an economic growth model that aimed at benefitting families. The foreign companies in China employed the locals. The authorities wanted to examine the impact of these industrial activities on the household. Families were receiving electronics from the company. The model considered various activities at the household level. The household per capita income selected as the economic growth model considered the economic interests of individual circle members.

The China Circle enhances household per capita income. The economic growth model enables these countries to advance their economic status. The circle has united Taiwan, Hong Kong, and South Coast provinces of China into a powerful bloc. The merger has a strong bargaining power when engaging foreigners in the economic initiative. These countries understood the value of having a single voice to articulate their economic desires. The circle was important for the members. China, Taiwan, and Hong Kong developed a strong trade relationship that allowed them to trade. The China Circle enabled the member countries to experience economic growth as a region. The China Circle benefitted the circle members on different levels. The intertwined interests among Hong Kong, Taiwan, and China allowed the countries to engage each other in economic activities. The household per capita income selected as the economic growth model considered the economic interests of individual circle members.

== Chinese Economic Area ==
The Chinese economic area covered Taiwan, Hong Kong, and China. The China Circle represented the Chinese economic area. The Chinese economic area shared the same geographical location and characteristics. Similarly, the region had a similar economic desire expressed in the china circle. As a result, it is easy for the Chinese economic area to work in unity through their circle. The Chinese economic area was a collection of different countries. However, China was geographically located to facilitate its neighbours' economic activities. As a result, China played a crucial role in enabling its economic area to achieve the desired results. Before developing the China circle, China and Taiwan did not have a perfect diplomatic relationship. The political and other differences tainted the diplomatic engagement between China and Taiwan. Still, the countries became part of the Chinese economic area. The region shared the same desire when developing the China Circle. As a result, China and Taiwan set aside their differences to enable the Chinese economic area to achieve its goals. The continuous engagement and introduction of various economic policies enabled Taiwan and China to cease their rivalry. Chinese economic area was crucial for the China circle members who had similar economic concerns when uniting. The unity was crucial in boosting the circle member states bargaining power. China was a prominent nation in the circle. Still, the member states prioritized collective interests to avoid inner conflicts and power wrangles.

== Cross-Strait ties ==
Taiwan political status compromised the relationship between the country and China. Taiwan and China were a crucial player in the China Circle. China split into two in 1949 was another stumbling block between Taiwan and China. Since 1949, Taiwan and China have had limited contact, creating tension between these disputing countries. Therefore, their misunderstanding was detrimental to the Chinese economic area before the China Circle formation. China was experiencing a political crisis. The political instability threatened the country. Taiwan and China maintained limited contact. Fewer interactions created tension between these disputing countries. The idea to have the China circle came when Taiwan and China had a strained relationship. It was hard at the beginning to enrol the circle. Therefore, Taiwan and China did not engage each other directly due to their hostilities initially. The circle ensured that nations' enmities did not compromise their performance. There were high chances that the circle could not achieve its goals due to nations' differences. However, despite the speculations the circle became crucial in helping the disputing countries attain their economic goals. The interactions also benefitted the rivals' countries to achieve satisfaction beyond the economic prosperity. The China Circle's objective demanded collective input to benefit the entire region. Therefore, having a cordial relationship was a requirement for the circle's states. The uniformity in the China Circle was beneficial in improving diplomatic relationships. The domestic companies also expanded their services to other circle member states to maximize their profits.
