= IAI =

IAI is an acronym for:

- IAI alphabet, another name for Africa Alphabet
- Iaido
- Information Architecture Institute
- Institute of Art and Ideas
- Inter-American Institute for Global Change Research
- International African Institute
- International Association for Identification
- Israel Aerospace Industries (Ha-Taasiya Ha-Avirit)
- Islamic Army in Iraq
- Independent Administrative Institution
- Intelligent Actuator (International Automation Industry), Japanese robot maker
- Istituto Affari Internazionali (Italian Institute of International Affairs)
- Institute of Archaeologists of Ireland
