= Spokane, Portland and Seattle class A2 =

SP&S class A-2
Type and origin
- Power type: Steam
- Builder: Baldwin Locomotive Works
- Build date: June 1887
Specifications
- Configuration
  - Whyte: 0-6-0
- Gauge: 4 ft 8 1/2 in (1,435 mm)
- Driver dia.: 50 in (1,270 mm)
- Loco weight: 71,550 lb (32,450 kg)
- Fuel type: Oil
- Boiler pressure: 135 psi (0.93 MPa)
- Cylinders: 2
- Cylinder size: 16 in × 24 in (410 mm × 610 mm)
Performance figures
- Tractive effort: 13,578 lbf (60.40 kN)
Career
- Operators: Spokane, Portland and Seattle Railway
- Class: A-2
- Numbers: 6
- Locale: United States
- Disposition: Sold to St. Helens Terminal and Dock on June 30, 1931

Spokane, Portland and Seattle Railway No. 6 was the only locomotive in Class A-2. Purchased from the Northern Pacific Railway for A. B. Hammond's Astoria and Columbia River Railway, number 6 came to the SP&S secondhand. It was used as a switch locomotive until 1931 when it was sold to the St Helens Terminal and Dock Co. at St. Helens Oregon.

== Background ==
The Astoria and Columbia River (A&CR) ran from Astoria to Goble, Oregon, where the A&CR met the Northern Pacific. In 1907 the NP purchased the A&CR to be a feeder line for the new Spokane, Portland and Seattle Railway. To help the new feeder line handle increasing freight traffic, an NP Switcher was sold to the A&CR on August 7, 1907. The SP&S took over the A&CR and on February 24, 1911, obtained all A&CR locomotives. The former A&CR switch locomotive number 1 became SP&S number 6.

== Construction history ==
Number 6 was built for the Northern Pacific by Baldwin Locomotive Works in 1887. Its builder's number was 8617.

== Operational history ==
SP&S Number 6 continued with switching duties at Astoria, Oregon. On June 30, 1931 SP&S Number 6 was sold to the St. Helens Terminal and Dock Company.

== Numbering ==
Originally numbered NP 386, and then NP 988, the A&CR numbered NP 988 as A&CR Number 1. The SP&S renumbered A&CR 1 to SP&S Number 6.

== Disposal ==
SP&S Number 6 was sold to St. Helens Terminal & Dock Co (StHT&D Co). Grande Claims that Number 6 then "blew up and was scrapped." However he gives no dates for this. Gartner only states that when the SP&S bought the St.HT&D Co in 1933 that an SP&S locomotive (SP&S 201) had to be brought in.

== Discrepancies ==
Gartner and Grande differ on several dates. Grande gives a build date of 1897. He also states that the date SP&S No. 6 was sold to the StHT&D Co was 1921. Gartner gives dates of 1887 and 1931.
