= Interactive Internet Activities =

Digital communication activities used in influence operations of the US

- Type of project: Digital communication program
- Owner: United States Department of Defense
- Established: June 2007
- Status: Unknown

Interactive Internet Activities (IIA) is a designation used by the United States Department of Defense (DoD) for online engagement with foreign audiences through two-way communication platforms. These activities, authorized in 2007, include the use of email, blogs, chat rooms, and Internet bulletin boards to provide information, counter extremist narratives, and advance U.S. political-military interests abroad.

The implementation of IIA created legal and jurisdictional challenges, primarily blurring the lines between military information operations and the public diplomacy mission, which is the legal responsibility of the United States Department of State.

== Authorization and purpose ==
In 2007, the Deputy Secretary of Defense issued policy memorandums that authorized IIA:

- June 2007: "Policy for Department of Defense (DoD) Interactive Internet Activities" authorized geographic Combatant Commands (COCOMs) to engage with foreign audiences via two-way communication platforms.
- August 2007: "Policy for Combatant Command (COCOM) Regional Websites Tailored to Foreign Audiences" permitted COCOMs to create and maintain regionally-focused websites with non-interactive content.

The stated purpose of IIA is to counter extremist activity, provide accurate information, and support U.S. interests overseas.

== Legal and jurisdictional challenges ==
IIA raised questions about its legal basis and potential conflicts with existing U.S. law and interagency responsibilities.

=== Overlap with public diplomacy ===
A central issue is whether IIA constitutes a military mission or public diplomacy. Public diplomacy is legally under the Department of State. The 2007 policy letters did not classify IIA as PSYOP, creating a gray area regarding appropriations and oversight.

=== The Smith–Mundt Act ===
The Smith–Mundt Act of 1948 regulates dissemination of information to foreign audiences. While intended to prevent domestic propaganda, the rise of the internet blurred these lines, and DoD guidance created a separate set of rules for engagement with foreign audiences.

== See also ==
- Information warfare
- Psychological operations (United States) (PSYOP)
- Public diplomacy of the United States
- United States Department of Defense
