= AI1 =

AI1 may refer to:

- American Idol season 1, an American TV series
- AI1, the call sign for Indian Presidential, Vice-Presidential, or Prime Minister airplanes
- AI1, an orbital AI data center (in development)
