= Goods and services tax (Hong Kong) =

The goods and services tax (GST) was a proposed value-added tax in Hong Kong. Consultation over a period of nine months was launched on 19 July 2006 and stirred considerable controversy.

It launched a fierce debate amongst local taxpayers, lawmakers, journalists, politicians, who hotly debated the need for the tax, and the shape any taxes should take. The plan to levy a GST was dropped on 5 December 2006, and has never been formally revisited since, although still suggested from time to time.

== Objectives ==
The Government argued that Hong Kong's tax base was narrow; thus, a single-rate GST was a viable option for Hong Kong in order to broaden the tax base and secure the sustainability of tax revenues base and the capacity to meet public expenditure needs in the long run.

=== The economic context ===
According to Denise Yue Chung-yee, 17% of working people paid 80% of the income tax of Hong Kong, i.e. households with monthly income more than HK$45,000 pay 80% of income tax of Hong Kong. Meanwhile, a significant portion of those 17% of working people were double income families. They are not really middle class, but only theoretically lower middle class who have economic ability of middle class. For example, a man who earns $40,000 a month pays "negligible" amount of income tax, while a family composed of a woman earning $30,000 and a man earning $30,000, totally earning $60,000 a month need to pay "very heavy" tax. The GST was supposed to curb this social problem. However, the marketing sector was getting to be the sector which employs most employees, and GST will harm the marketing sector. In addition, it was doubted whether households who earn around $20,000 a month had the economic ability to pay tax.

== The Goods and Services Tax ==
The GST would be levied at a flat rate of 5%. The government would decrease or eliminate other taxes to make the policy revenue neutral.

== Key features ==
- exports of goods, international supplies, and financial supplies would not be subject to GST;
- residential property sales and rentals would not be subject to GST;
- GST postponement schemes would be provided to alleviate importers' cash-flow issues arising from GST;
- the Government would be GST-registered to provide a level playing field with the private sector;
- a Tourist Refund Scheme would be included to allow visitors to obtain a refund of GST on goods they had purchased in Hong Kong and were taking home with them; and
- charities would be treated as "taxable persons" to allow them to reclaim input GST.

=== Proposed relief measures ===
==== For individuals ====
- reduction in tax rates for all existing taxpayers, provided registered in Hong Kong;
- an upfront, one-off supplement would be provided to households Social Security benefits;
- an annual cash GST allowance on a per-household basis for low-income households not receiving Comprehensive Social Security Assistance;
- a universal annual "GST credit" for each household to be used against water and sewage charges for an initial five-year period; and
- a universal annual "GST credit" per household to be used against rates for an initial five-year period.

==== For businesses ====
- a cut in profits-tax rates;
- abolishing the capital fee to encourage more businesses to incorporate in Hong Kong;
- reducing the motor vehicle first registration tax and duties on liquor, petrol, diesel, aircraft fuel and methyl alcohol;
- cutting charges for import and export declarations;
- abolishing the 3% hotel accommodation tax;
- increasing tax-deduction limits for charitable donations; and
- one-off set-up assistance to small and medium-sized businesses that volunteered to register for GST.

==== Pledge to maintain revenue neutrality ====
The Government proposed that, for the first five years after the GST's introduction, all revenue it would generate after deducting administrative costs would be returned to the community as tax relief and other compensation measures, for example, salaries or profits tax reduction, or to increasing public spending on education, health, social welfare, law and order or infrastructure.

== Opposition ==
The GST proposal was universally condemned by all the major parties in the Legco.

The first protest against the GST was held on 7 August 2006 by the Liberal Party, with 6000 participants. The second protest against the GST was held on 20 August 2006 by the Democratic Party, where 500 people participated.

According to Financial Secretary Henry Tang, the government had collected 2,200 written submissions in the five months of consultations - with 65 percent opposed to the plan and 30 percent in favour.

== Demise ==
In a surprise announcement made on 5 December 2006, Henry Tang Ying-yen withdrew the plan citing lack of public support. "It's clear ... that we've not been able to convince the majority to accept a GST as the main option to address the tax base problem," he said. The withdrawal was linked to the comments, three days earlier, of Chinese state leader Wu Bangguo to senior Hong Kong officials "to keep their fingers on the pulse of the people" and to foster "social harmony", and to the impending sub-sector polls for the Election Committee which will pick the new Chief Executive in March 2007. However, after the announcement, Henry Tang insisted the decision to withdraw the proposal was "entirely my own," and free of any political consideration.

== See also ==
- Goods and Services Tax (India)
- Goods and Services Tax (Australia)
- Goods and Services Tax (Canada)
- Goods and Services Tax (New Zealand)
- Goods and Services Tax (Singapore)
- Goods and Services Tax (Malaysia)
