= French Fab =

French Accreditation award

French Fab is an accreditation award created 2 October 2017 in order to federate French companies and to promote French industries throughout the world.

It is a label owned by Bpifrance.

The French government has been inspired by the French Tech created in 2013 to promote startups and French IT.

== History ==
The award has been created 2 October 2017 by Bruno Le Maire, Minister of Finance.
