= Quaero =

French-German academic search engine project

Quaero (Latin for I seek) was a European initiative designed to compete with the Google search engine. It was announced in 2005 by Jacques Chirac and Gerhard Schröder, the political leaders of France and of Germany. As a research and development program, it had the goal of developing multimedia and multilingual indexing and management tools for professional and general public applications (such as search engines). The European Commission approved the aid granted by France on 11 March 2008.

This program was supported by the OSEO. It was a French project with the participation of several German partners. The consortium was led by Thomson SA. Other companies involved in the consortium were France Télécom, Exalead, Bertin Technologies, Jouve, Grass Valley GmbH, Vecsys, Vocapia Research, LTU Technologies, and Synapse Développement. Many public research institutes were also involved, including National Institute for Research in Computer Science and Control, Laboratoire d'informatique pour la mécanique et les sciences de l'ingénieur, IRCAM, RWTH Aachen, University of Karlsruhe, Institut de recherche en informatique de Toulouse, Clips Imag, Groupe des Écoles des Télécommunications, Institut National de la Recherche Agronomique; as well as other public organisations such as Institut national de l'audiovisuel, Bibliothèque nationale de France, Laboratoire d'Informatique de Paris-Nord (LIPN, Sorbonne Paris North University) and Direction Générale de l'Armement.

According to the AII press release, the main targeted applications could be divided into three broad classes: multimedia indexing and search tools for professional and general public use, including mobile environments; professional solutions for production, post-production, management and distribution of multimedia documents; and facilitation of access to cultural heritage such as audiovisual archives and digital libraries.

== Announcements and history ==
Quaero was announced by Jacques Chirac and Gerhard Schröder during the French-German ministerial conference in April 2005. It was put forward again by Jacques Chirac in August 2005 at the inauguration of the new agency created to fund such programs, the Agence de l'innovation industrielle (AII), and in January 2006 in his New Year addresses, which received much attention from the public. Quaero was part of the first programs selected by the AII in April 2006. In December 2006, the new German government announced that it would devote its share of the funding to a slightly modified program geared toward knowledge management and semantic web, under the name of Theseus Program. Quaero received the approval of the European Commission in March 2008. €99m from the French government would go towards development of the program.

== The search engine ==
Quaero was often described as a European competitor to Google as well as to other commercial search engines such as Yahoo, Microsoft's Bing and Ask.com.

Quaero was not intended to be a text-based search engine but was mainly meant for multimedia search. The search engine would have used techniques for recognizing, transcribing, indexing, and automatic translation of audiovisual documents and would have operated in several languages. There was also a plan to have automatic recognition and indexing of images.

According to an article in The Economist, Quaero would have allowed users to search using a "query image", not just a group of keywords. In a process known as "image mining", software that recognizes shapes and colours would have been used to look for and retrieve still images and video clips that contained images similar to the query image. (The software was supplied by LTU Technologies.)

As France was researching image-searching, Germany was supposed to be advancing voice clip and sound media searches, with the intention of transcribing their content to text, and translating it to other languages, before they pulled out of the project. This would also allow for "query sound clips" following the paradigm of the "query image" mentioned above.

== Criticism ==
The French satirical newspaper Le Canard enchaîné pointed out that the funding behind the project was dwarfed by both Microsoft and Google. Search experts Autonomy, (Financial Times) called the plan "a blatant case of misguided and unnecessary nationalism". The main issues were that: by the time of Quaero's launch, the search engine market would already have been generations ahead of Quaero in media and device capabilities; some argue that Chirac was more interested in defending French pride than global advancement of the Internet.

Writing in IEEE Spectrum, Nick Tredennick commented that "Going head-to-head with Google with a project involving well-funded, energetic entrepreneurs would be foolish. Attempting the same with a multigovernment collaboration is beyond description."

According to the print edition of The Economist, January 6, 2007 (pp. 5), Quaero "was reportedly scrapped" since the German partners "grumbled about the cost and have indicated they will produce their own, scaled-down search engine".

== German departure ==
On December 18, 2006, Hartmut Schauerte, a state secretary within the Ministry for Economics and Labour, announced during the IT-summit in Potsdam that a German consortium had put together a semantic search project called Theseus Program that would be distinct from Quaero.

The main source of disagreement was the format of the search engine, with German engineers favoring a text-based search engine and the French engineers favoring a multimedia search engine. Many German engineers also balked at what they thought was becoming too much of an anti-Google project, rather than a project driven by its own ideals.

== End ==
The project ended on December 31, 2013.

== See also ==
- Plan Calcul
- Cloudwatt
