= Deindustrialisation by country =

Deindustrialisation refers to the process of social and economic change caused by the removal or reduction of industrial activity and employment in a country or region, especially heavy industry or manufacturing industry. Deindustrialisation is common to all mature Western economies, as international trade, social changes, and urbanisation have changed the financial demographics after World War II. Phenomena such as the mechanisation of labour render industrial societies obsolete, and lead to the de-establishment of industrial communities.

== Background ==
Theories that predict or explain deindustrialisation have a long intellectual lineage. Karl Marx's theory of declining (industrial) profit argues that technological innovation enables more efficient means of production, resulting in increased physical productivity, i.e., a greater output of use value per unit of capital invested. In parallel, however, technological innovations replace people with machinery, and the organic composition of capital increases. Assuming only labour can produce new additional value, this greater physical output embodies a smaller value and surplus value. The average rate of industrial profit therefore declines in the longer term.

George Reisman (2002) identified inflation as a contributor to deindustrialisation. In his analysis, the process of fiat money inflation distorts the economic calculations necessary to operate capital-intensive manufacturing enterprises, and makes the investments necessary for sustaining the operations of such enterprises unprofitable.

The term deindustrialisation crisis has been used to describe the decline of labour-intensive industry in a number of countries and the flight of jobs away from cities. One example is labour-intensive manufacturing. After free-trade agreements were instituted with less developed nations in the 1980s and 1990s, labour-intensive manufacturers relocated production facilities to Third World countries with much lower wages and lower standards. In addition, technological inventions that required less manual labour, such as industrial robots, eliminated many manufacturing jobs.

== Australia ==
In 2008, four companies mass-produced cars in Australia. Mitsubishi ceased production in March 2008, followed by Ford in 2016, and Holden and Toyota in 2017.

Holden bodyworks were manufactured at Elizabeth, South Australia and engines were produced at the Fishermens Bend plant in Port Melbourne, Victoria. In 2006, Holden's export revenue was just under A$1.3 billion. In March 2012, Holden was given a $270 million lifeline by the Australian government. In return, Holden planned to inject over $1 billion into car manufacturing in Australia. They estimated the new investment package would return around $4 billion to the Australian economy and see GM Holden continue making cars in Australia until at least 2022. However, Holden announced on 11 December 2013 that Holden cars would no longer be manufactured in Australia from the end of 2017.

Ford had two main factories, both in Victoria: located in the Geelong suburb of Norlane and the northern Melbourne suburb of Broadmeadows. Both plants were closed down in October 2016.

Total employment in Australian textile, clothing and footwear manufacturing (thousands of people) since 1984

Until 2006, Toyota had factories in Port Melbourne and Altona, Victoria. After that all manufacturing had taken place at Altona. In 2008, Toyota exported 101,668 vehicles worth $1,900 million. In 2011 the figures were "59,949 units worth $1,004 million". On 10 February 2014 it was announced that by the end of 2017 Toyota would cease manufacturing vehicles and engines in Australia.

Until trade liberalisation in the mid-1980s, Australia had a large textile industry. This decline continued through the first decade of the 21st century. Since the 1980s, tariffs have steadily been reduced; in early 2010, the tariffs were reduced from 17.5 per cent to 10 per cent on clothing, and 7.5–10% to 5% for footwear and other textiles. As of 2010, most textile manufacturing, even by Australian companies, is performed in Asia.

== Brazil ==
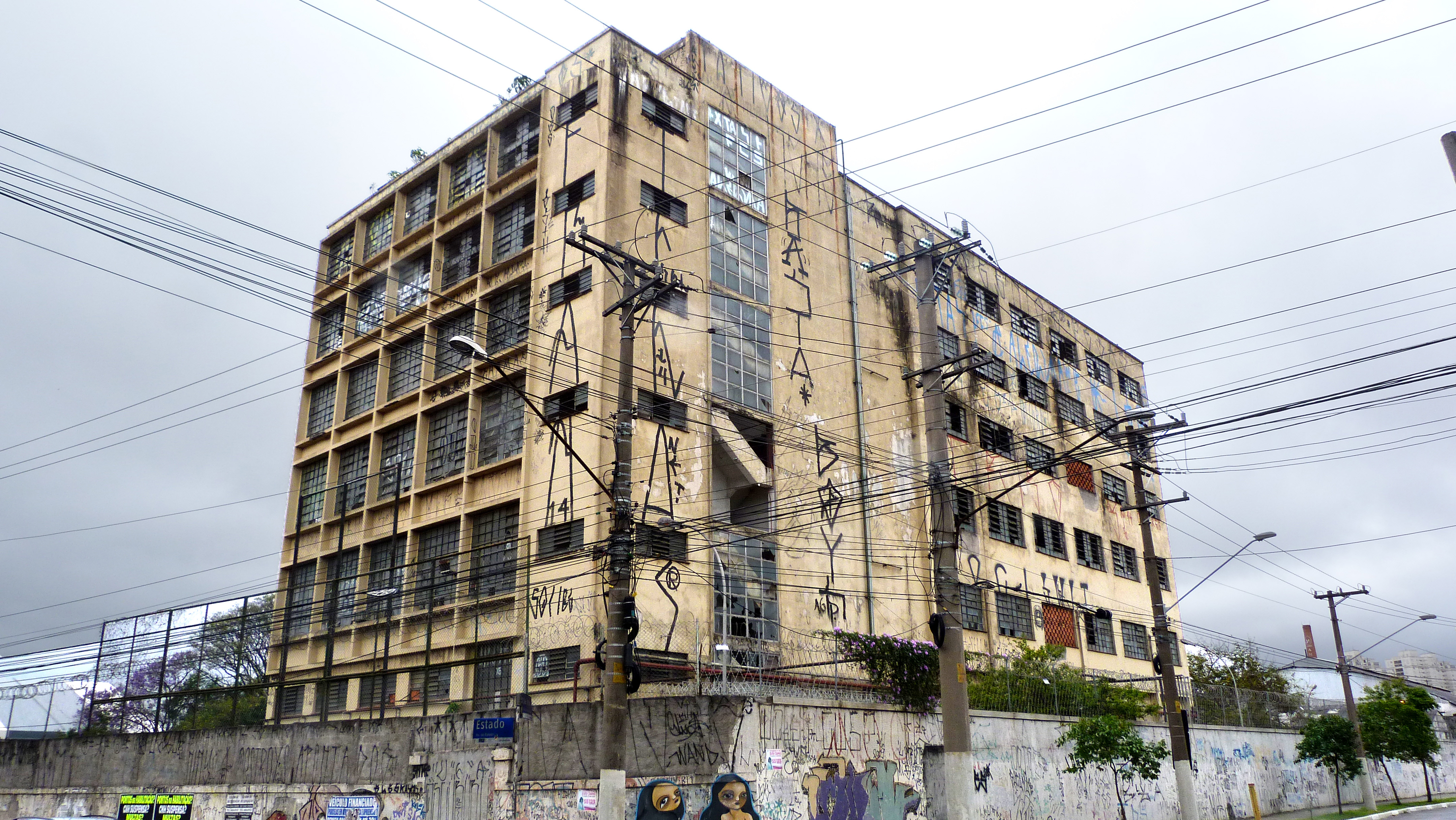
Ruins of the Edifício Companhia Antarctica Paulista, in São Paulo

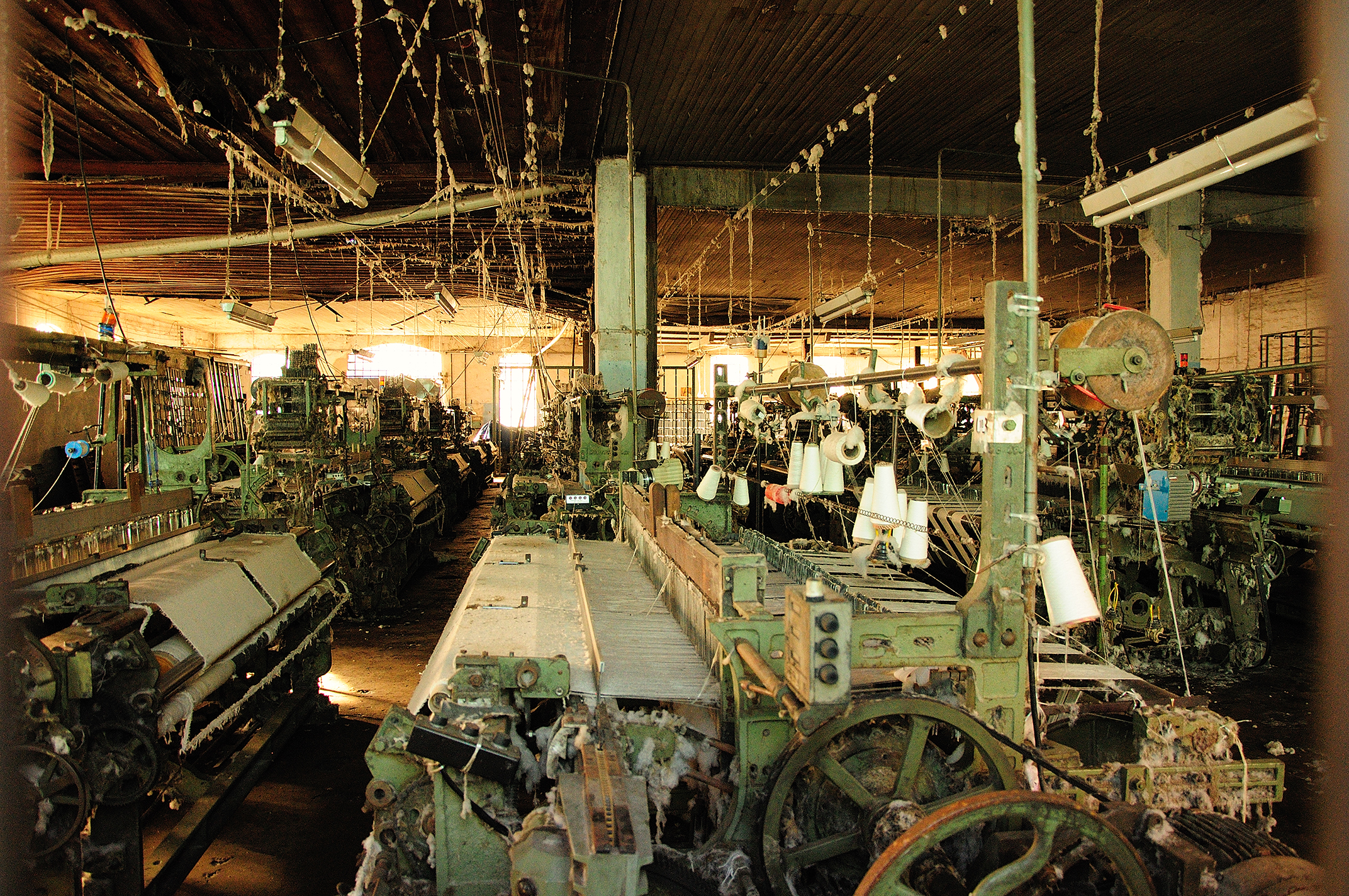
Abandoned weaving factory in the Carioba Industrial Complex, in Americana, São Paulo

The deindustrialization of Brazil was a process of reducing the capacity of Brazilian industry after the 1980s. Between 1930 and 1980, Brazil industrialized and developed rapidly, under a strategy based on import substitution and external debt. Until the 1970s, Brazilian industry was stronger than that of South Korea. After the Latin American debt crisis in the 1980s and the adjustments that stabilized the economy in the following decade, such as the Plano Real, a continuous process of premature deindustrialization devastated the sector, especially the manufacturing industry. Industry, which in 1985 made up half of the Brazilian GDP, in 2020 represented only one fifth, these values being respectively the maximum and minimum of the historical series that began in 1947. The share of industrial employment in relation to total formal employment in 1986 was 27% and fell to 15% in 2019.

== Canada ==
Much of the academic literature pertaining to Canada hints at deindustrialisation as a problem in the older manufacturing areas of Ontario and the east. Nationwide, over the past fifty years, according to 2008 OECD data, industrial production and overall employment have been steadily increasing. Industrial production levelled off a bit between 2004 and 2007, but its production levels are the highest that they have ever been. The perception of deindustrialisation that the literature refers to deals with the fact that although employment and economic production have risen, the economy has shifted drastically from manufacturing jobs to service sector jobs. Only 13% of the current Canadian population has a job in the industrial sector. Technological advancements in industry over the past fifty years have allowed for industrial production to keep rising during the Canadian economic shift to the service sector. 69% of the GDP of Canada comes from the service sector.

== France ==
The Trente Glorieuses (a thirty-year period of economic growth that began after World War II) ended after the first oil price crisis (1973/74), around 1975. Unemployment grew, and the franc was devalued three times. Between 1995 and 2015, France lost nearly half of its factories and a third of its industrial jobs. Many industrial towns and regions depopulated.

In 2023, Nicolas Dufourcq published La désindustrialisation de la France: 1995-2015. He wrote that it was the whole of French society that turned away from industry. He expressed optimism that France has started anew with "new guns" and that it is possible to revive many industrial sites because technology has progressed, because emerging countries have lost competitiveness because the French themselves have changed and are demanding a low-carbon and circular industry.

== Germany ==
=== Post‑World War II and the Morgenthau Plan ===
In occupied Germany after World War II, Allied occupation authorities initially pursued policies aimed at limiting Germany's industrial capacity. The proposed Morgenthau Plan sought to convert Germany into a largely agricultural and light-industry economy, but it was never fully implemented. The plan was present in the U.S. occupation directive JCS 1067 and in the Allied "industrial disarmament" plans. On February 2, 1946, a dispatch from Berlin reported:

Some progress has been made in converting Germany to an agricultural and light industry economy, said Brigadier General William H. Draper, Jr., chief of the American Economics Division, who emphasised that there was general agreement on that plan. He explained that Germany's future industrial and economic pattern was being drawn for a population of 66,500,000. On that basis, he said, the nation will need large imports of food and raw materials to maintain a minimum standard of living. General agreement, he continued, had been reached on the types of German exports — coal, coke, electrical equipment, leather goods, beer, wines, spirits, toys, musical instruments, textiles and apparel — to take the place of the heavy industrial products that formed most of Germany's pre-war exports.

According to some historians, the U.S. government abandoned the Morgenthau plan as policy in September 1946 with Secretary of State James F. Byrnes' speech "Restatement of Policy on Germany".

Others have argued that credit should be given to former U.S. President Herbert Hoover, who in one of his reports from Germany, dated March 18, 1947, argued for a change in occupation policy, amongst other things stating, "There is the illusion that the New Germany left after the annexations can be reduced to a 'pastoral state'. It cannot be done unless we exterminate or move 25,000,000 people out of it."

Worries about the sluggish recovery of the European economy, which before the war had depended on the German industrial base, and growing Soviet influence amongst a German population subject to food shortages and economic misery, caused the Joint Chiefs of Staff, and Generals Clay and Marshall to start lobbying the Truman administration for a change of policy.

In July 1947, President Harry S. Truman rescinded on "national security grounds" the punitive occupation directive JCS 1067, which had directed the U.S. forces of occupation in Germany to "take no steps looking toward the economic rehabilitation of Germany [or] designed to maintain or strengthen the German economy". It was replaced by JCS 1779, which instead noted that "[a]n orderly, prosperous Europe requires the economic contributions of a stable and productive Germany."

It had taken over two months for General Clay to overcome continued resistance to the new directive JCS 1779, but on July 10, 1947, it was finally approved at a meeting of the SWNCC. The final version of the document "was purged of the most important elements of the Morgenthau plan."

The dismantling of West German industrial facilities largely ended in 1951, although elements of "industrial disarmament" continued through restrictions on steel production, industrial capacity, and certain strategic industries. All remaining restrictions were finally rescinded on May 5, 1955. "The last act of the Morgenthau drama occurred on that date or when the Saar was returned to Germany."

Vladimir Petrov concluded: "The victorious Allies … delayed by several years the economic reconstruction of the war torn continent, a reconstruction which subsequently cost the US billions of dollars."

=== Contemporary industrial decline and restructuring ===
Germany had historically relied on relatively inexpensive pipeline gas from Russia to support the economic competitiveness of its energy-heavy industries. When Germany cut down on its gas imports from Russia in 2022, its energy prices risen, placing pressure on industries such as chemicals and steel that rely heavily on energy input. Germany has also phased out its nuclear power in April 2023. With renewable energy expansion not yet fully offsetting the loss of nuclear and Russian gas supplies, electricity prices in Germany remained among the highest in the world, with some estimates placing Germans paying three times the global average for electricity.

Germany's industrial base has also heavily relied on its car manufacturing industry particularly on production of internal combustion engine (ICE) vehicles. But high energy costs and China's rapid emergence as a leading EV manufacturer, has placed significant strain on the industry, resulting in mass layoffs of automotive jobs with 51,500 lost in 2025. In 2026, Volkswagen announced it will cut 50,000 jobs by 2030 after experiencing large reductions in profits.

== India ==
The economic de-industrialisation of India refers to a period of studied reduction in industrial based activities within the Indian economy from 1757 to 1947.

Parts of the Indian economy were controlled under the rule of the British East India Company from 1757 to 1858. This period involved protectionist policies, the restricting, or tariffing, of the sale of British and other foreign manufactured goods within Company territory, and Indian goods and services within Britain. A 10% tariff was imposed on East Indian Company textile imports into England from 1685, and it was doubled to 20% in 1690, with the 1698 Calico Acts restricting the importation of printed Indian textiles, and Scotland from the Duties on East India Goods Act 1707, while the Company had a monopoly on all English, and later British, trade, in either direction, from its 1661 charter revision, to the Charter Act 1813. From 1858 until 1947, much of the Indian economy was controlled directly under British imperial rule, also known as the British Raj.

Amiya Bagchi claimed that the de-industrialisation processes observed in India were a product of colonial rule intentionally aimed at benefiting the British economy. The Industrial Revolution in Europe was dependent on a significant rebalancing of the artisan and manufacturing activities in several European colonies in Asia including India.

== Japan ==
In Japan, deindustrialisation, known as Sangyo-kudoka (literally 'the hollowing of industry'), began in the 1980s and continued through the 1990s and 2000s. During the 1980s, Japan's and West Germany's trade surpluses became politicised in the United States, which led to demands to curb the competitiveness of Japan's and Germany's manufacturing industry. These attempts culminated in the 1985 Plaza Accord, in which it was decided to appreciate the Japanese Yen and the Deutsche Mark against other currencies. This led to the rapid relocation of Japanese manufacturing capacities to other parts of Asia and the rest of the world. At the time, Japan's GDP per capita was higher than that of any other G7 country, which contributed to high labour costs and weighed on the competitiveness of the manufacturing sector. After China joined the WTO, this trend accelerated further. More recently, increased energy costs following the drastic reduction in nuclear power generation under Naoto Kan's administration after the 2011 Fukushima disaster have also proven highly detrimental.

== Poland ==
In Poland, as in many other former communist countries, deindustrialisation occurred rapidly in the years after the fall of communism in 1989, with many unprofitable industries going bankrupt with the switch to market economy, and other state-owned industries being destroyed by a variety of means, including arbitrarily changed credit and tax policies. The deindustrialisation in Poland was based on a neoliberalism-inspired doctrine (systemic transformation according to the requirements of Western financial institutions) and on the conviction that industry-based economy was a thing of the past. However, the extent of deindustrialisation was greater in Poland than in other European, including post-communist, countries: more than a third of total large and midsize industrial assets were eliminated. The perceived economic reasons for deindustrialisation were reinforced by political and ideological motivations, such as removal of the remaining socialist influences concentrated in large enterprises (opposed to rapid privatization and shock therapy, as prescribed by the Balcerowicz Plan) and by land speculation (plants were sold at prices even lower than the value of the land on which they were located). Among such "privatized" institutions there were many cases of hostile takeovers (involved in 23% of all assets transferred), when industrial entities were sold and then changed to the service sector or liquidated to facilitate a takeover of the old company's market by the buying (typically foreign) firm.

According to comprehensive research data compiled by economist Andrzej Karpiński and others, 25–30% of the reductions were economically justified, while the rest resulted from various processes that were controversial, often erroneous or pathological, including actions aimed at quick self-enrichment on the part of people with decision-making capacities. Unlike in the case of the Western deindustrialisation of the preceding years, in Poland modern competitive industries with established markets were also eliminated, including the electronic, telecommunications, computer, industrial machinery, armament and chemical industries. The abandoned domestic and foreign markets, often in Eastern Europe and the Third World countries, had subsequently been taken over by non-Polish interests. Nearly half (47%) of the lost enterprises represented consumer product light industry, rather than heavy industry. Capitalist Poland's early economic policies resulted in economic and social crises including high unemployment, and in what some see as irredeemable losses, impacting Poland's situation today. At the same time however, many constructive developments took place, including the widespread rise of entrepreneurship, and, especially after Poland joined the European Union, significant economic growth. The transformation process, as executed, generally replaced large enterprises with small, creating an environment inimical to innovation but conducive to human capital flight.

The evaluation of Poland's economic advancement depends on the criteria used. For example, the country's industrial output had increased 2.4 times between 1989 and 2015, while the Polish GDP's percentage of the gross world product dropped from 2.4 in 1980 to 0.5–0.6 in 2015. In a number of measured categories of progress, Poland places behind its European Union formerly communist neighbors (the Czech Republic, Slovakia, Hungary, Lithuania), which had not undertaken deindustrialisation policies as radical as that of Poland.

== Soviet Union ==
Prior to its dissolution in 1991, the Soviet Union had the second-largest economy in the world after the United States. The economy of the Soviet Union was the world's first and most notable centrally planned economy. It was based on a system of state ownership and managed through Gosplan (the State Planning Commission), Gosbank (the State Bank) and Gossnab (State Commission for Materials and Equipment Supply). Economic planning was through a series of five-year plans. The emphasis was put on rapid development of heavy industry, and the nation became one of the world's top manufacturers of a large number of basic and heavy industrial products, but it lagged behind in the output of light industrial production and consumer durables.

As the Soviet economy grew more complex, it required more and more complex disaggregation of control figures (plan targets) and factory inputs. As it required more communication between the enterprises and the planning ministries, and as the number of enterprises, trusts, and ministries multiplied, the Soviet economy started stagnating. The Soviet economy was increasingly sluggish when it came to responding to change, adapting cost−saving technologies, and providing incentives at all levels to improve growth, productivity and efficiency.

Most information in the Soviet economy flowed from the top down, and economic planning was often done based on faulty or outdated information, particularly in sectors with large numbers of consumers. As a result, some goods tended to be underproduced, leading to shortages, while other goods were overproduced and accumulated in storage. Some factories developed a system of barter and either exchanged or shared raw materials and parts, while consumers developed a black market for goods that were particularly sought after but constantly underproduced.

Conceding the weaknesses of their past approaches in solving new problems, the leaders of the late 1980s, headed by Mikhail Gorbachev, were seeking to mold a program of economic reform to galvanise the economy. However, by 1990 the Soviet government had lost control over economic conditions. Government spending increased sharply as an increasing number of unprofitable enterprises required state support and consumer price subsidies to continue.

The industrial production system in the Soviet Union suffered a political and economic collapse in 1991, after which a transition from centrally planned to market-driven economies occurred. With the collapse of the Soviet Union, the economic integration of the Soviet republics was dissolved, and overall industrial activity declined substantially. A lasting legacy remains in the physical infrastructure created during decades of combined industrial production practices.

== United Kingdom ==
The United Kingdom has experienced considerable deindustrialisation, especially in both heavy industry, such as mining and steel, and light manufacturing. New jobs have appeared with either low wages, or with high skill requirements that the laid-off workers lack. Meanwhile, the political reverberations have been growing. Jim Tomlinson agrees that deindustrialization is a major phenomenon but denies that it represents a decline or failure.

The UK's share of manufacturing output had risen from 9.5% in 1830, during the Industrial Revolution, to 22.9% in the 1870s. It fell to 13.6% by 1913, 10.7% by 1938, and 4.9% by 1973. Overseas competition, trade unionism, the welfare state, loss of the British Empire, and lack of innovation have all been put forward as explanations for the industrial decline. It reached crisis point in the 1970s, with a worldwide energy crisis, high inflation, and a dramatic influx of low-cost manufactured goods from Asia. Coal mining quickly collapsed and practically disappeared by the 21st century. Railways were decrepit, more textile mills closed than opened, steel employment fell sharply, and the car-making industry suffered. Popular responses varied a great deal; Tim Strangleman et al. found a range of responses from the affected workers: for example, some invoked a glorious industrial past to cope with their new-found personal economic insecurity, while others looked to the European Union for help. It has been argued that these reverberations contributed towards the popular vote in favour of Brexit in 2016.

Economists developed two alternative interpretations to explain de-industrialization in Britain. The first was developed by Oxford economists Robert Bacon and Walter Eltis. They argue that the public sector expansion deprived the private sector of sufficient labour and capital. In a word, the government “crowded out” the private sector. A variation of this theory emphasizes the increases in taxation cut the funds needed for wages and profits. Union demands for higher wage rates resulted in lower profitability in the private sector, and a fall in investment. However, many economists counter that public expenditures have lowered unemployment levels, not increased them.

The second explanation is the New Cambridge model associated with Wynne Godley and Francis Cripps. It stresses the long-term decline and competitiveness of British industry. During the 1970s especially, the manufacturing sector steadily lost its share of both home and international markets. The historic substantial surplus of exports over imports slipped into an even balance. That balance is maintained by North Sea oil primarily, and to a lesser extent from some efficiency improvement in agriculture and service sectors. The New Cambridge model posits several different causes for the decline in competitiveness.

Up until the 1970s, the model had poor delivery times and product design. The implication is that although research levels are high in Britain, industry has been laggard in implementing innovation.

Since 1979, however, the model points to the appreciation of Pound sterling against other currencies, so that British products are more expensive. In terms of policy, the New Cambridge model recommends general import controls, or else unemployment will continue to mount. The model indicates that deindustrialization is a serious problem which threatens the nation's ability to maintain balance of payments equilibrium in the long run. The situation after North Sea oil runs out appears troublesome. De-industrialization imposes serious social consequences. Workers skilled in the manufacturing sector are no longer needed, and are shuffled off to lower paying, less technologically valuable jobs. Computerization and globalization are compounding that problem.

== United States ==
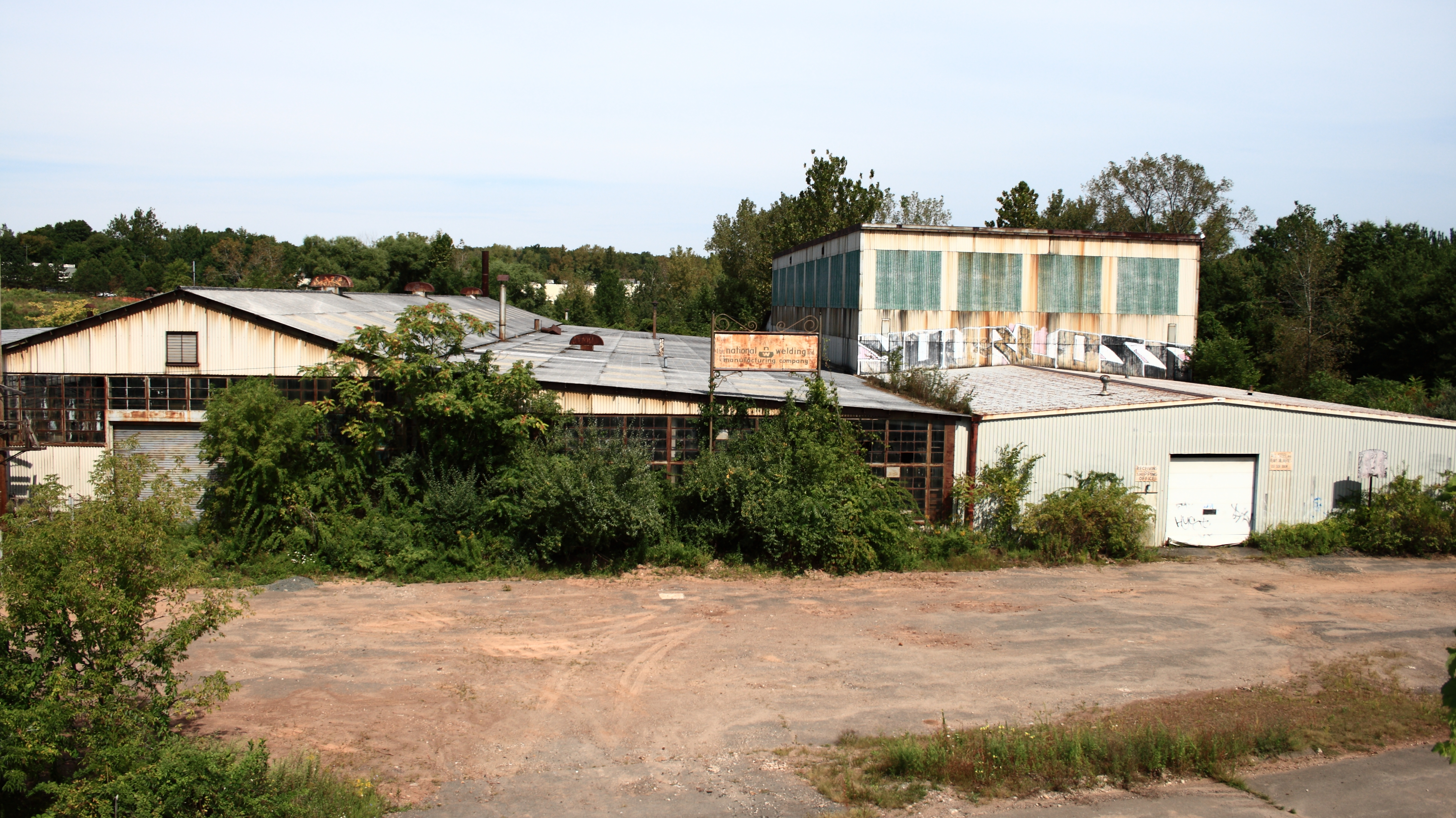
A former industrial site in Newington, Connecticut, which ceased operations in 1994 and was then leased as professional office space

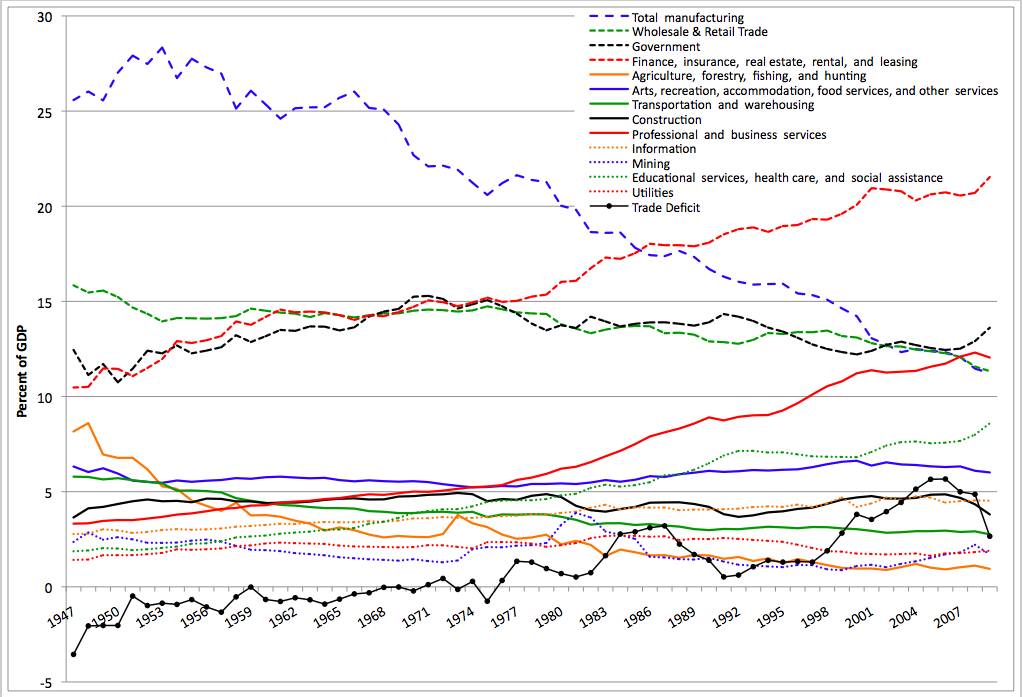
Sectors of the U.S. economy as a per cent of GDP from 1947 to 2009

In the United States, deindustrialisation is mostly a regional phenomenon centered in the Rust Belt, a region including the original industrial centres from New England to the Great Lakes. The number of people employed in manufacturing nationwide peaked in 1979 at 19,553,000 jobs, although the most significant losses occurred in the first decade of the 21st century, when the number of manufacturing jobs dropped from 17,284,000 jobs in January 2001 to 11,460,000 jobs in January 2010.

An analysis by the Economic Policy Institute cited the reduction in trade barriers from China's entry into the World Trade Organization and China's lack of labor and environmental regulation and its policy of devaluing its currency for cheaper exports as a catalyst for manufacturers to relocate their factories to China, where costs were significantly lower. The institute argued that the trade deficit resulting from this relocation in production displaced jobs by disrupting the balance of trade between the countries, causing the demand for domestic production to decrease as firms become more reliant on imports. However some dispute this explanation as the primary cause for the decline, citing other reasons as more important. A paper by the Peterson Institute for International Economics argued that the decrease in the share of employment occupied by manufacturing jobs was more due to increasing productivity meeting plateauing consumer demand, decreasing the demand for labor.

Despite deindustrialization, the United States remains a leader in industrial output, but deindustrialization has had a significant regional impact on certain regions of the nation, especially the traditional industrial centers that now comprise the Rust Belt, including Michigan, Ohio, Pennsylvania, and other states.

Certain manufacturing sectors in the U.S. remain vibrant. The production of electronic equipment has risen by over 50%, while that of clothing has fallen by over 60%. Following a moderate downturn, industrial production grew slowly but steadily between 2003 and 2007. The sector, however, averaged less than 1% growth annually from 2000 to 2007; from early 2008, moreover, industrial production again declined, and by June 2009, had fallen by over 15%, the sharpest decline since the Great Depression. Since then, output has begun recovering.

The population of the United States has nearly doubled since the 1950s, adding approximately 150 million people. During this period, between 1950 and 2007, however, the proportion of the population living in the traditional manufacturing cities in the Northeastern United States has declined significantly. During the 1950s, the nation's twenty largest cities held nearly a fifth of the U.S. population. By 2006, however, the percentage of Americans living in these cities dropped to approximately ten percent of the population.

In Michigan, Detroit saw its population drop from a peak of 1,849,568 in 1950 to 713,777 in 2010, the largest drop in population of any major city in the U.S. (1,135,971) and the second-largest drop in per capita people lost behind St. Louis's 62.7% drop. One of the first industries to decline was the textile industry in New England, as its factories shifted to the South.

Since the 1970s, textiles have also declined in the Southeast. New England responded by developing a high-tech economy, especially in education and medicine, relying on the region's educated workforce.

As Americans migrated away from the manufacturing centres, they formed sprawling suburbs, and many former small cities have grown tremendously in the last 50 years. In 2005, for instance, Phoenix, Arizona, has grown by 43,000 people, an increase in population greater than any other city in the United States. Contrast that with the fact that in 1950, Phoenix was only the 99th-largest city in the nation with a population of 107,000. By 2005, the population of Phoenix had grown to 1.5 million, ranking as the sixth-largest city in the U.S.

== See also ==
- Newly industrialized country
- Industrialisation
- Deindustrialization
- Industrial Revolution
- Division of labour
- Mass production
