= SOGEADE =

French holding company

- Native name: Société de gestion de l'aéronautique, de la défense et de l'espace
- Defunct: 2013
- Fate: Dissolved
- Owners: SOGEPA; Désirade

SOGEADE (Société de gestion de l'aéronautique, de la défense et de l'espace) was a French intermediate holding company. It was dissolved in 2013.

== History ==
SOGEADE was created solely to hold French interests in the newly founded EADS (Airbus), as an intermediate holding company, which were owned by the state of France (through SOGEPA) and Lagardère Group (Désirade). In 2005, SOGEADE had the same shares holding ratio with Daimler AG for 29.9%.

In 2006 Daimler and Lagardère agreed to sell 7.5% shares each to the open public. In 2007 Daimler agreed to sell 7.5% shares of Airbus to Dedalus while Lagardère issued mandatory exchangeable bonds for the 7.5% shares of Airbus to Natixis. In 2013 the French State's portion of ownership was transferred to SOGEPA, while SOGEADE became the wholly owned subsidiary of Lagardère. Soon later Lagardère sold all the shares.

== Evolution of shares in EADS ==
- 29.9% of EADS at 31 December 2005
- 29.95% of EADS at 31 March 2007
- 27.53% of EADS at 31 September 2007
- 22.50% of EADS at 31 March 2009
- 22.46% of EADS at 31 December 2009 (183,337,704)
- 22.46% of EADS at 31 December 2010 (183,337,704)
- 22.35% of EADS at 31 December 2011 (183,337,704)
- 22.16% of EADS at 31 December 2012 (183,337,704)
- 7.4% of Airbus in April 2013 (61,000,000)

== Shareholders ==
- SOGEPA (0%) (50% at creation, 60% end of 2008, 66.6% in 2009) – Wholly owned by French government
- Désirade (100%) (50% at creation, 40% end of 2008, 33.3% in 2009) – Wholly owned by Lagardère Group.
