= Agence des participations de l'État =

Agency of the French government managing the state's holdings in about 70 firms

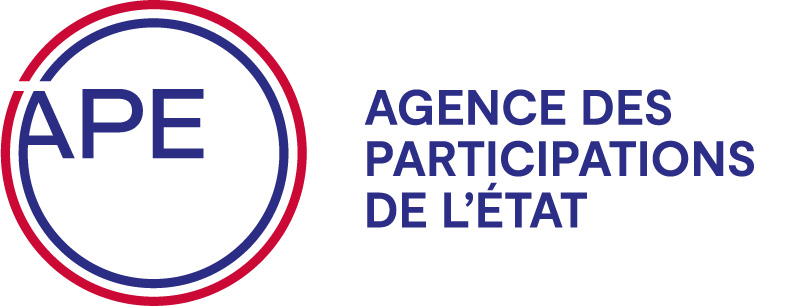

Government agency overview
- Formed: 2004
- Jurisdiction: France
- Motto: Incarner l'État actionnaire
- Employees: 53 (2018)
- Minister responsible: Ministry of the Economy and Finance
- Website: economie.gouv.fr/ape

Agence des participations de l'État (French pronunciation: [aʒɑ̃s de paʁtisipasjɔ̃ də leta], APE, lit. 'State Participations Agency'), created in 2004 under the government of Jean-Pierre Raffarin, is the French agency responsible for managing the State's shareholdings in companies of strategic importance. As of 2022, APE has €732.514 billion worth of assets under management, which includes investments in companies involved in energy, industry, defence, transport, communication and finance, among others.

== History ==
The State participation agency is a Service à compétence nationale (service with national competence) created in September 2004. The creation of the Agency responded to the need to clarify the role of a shareholder of the State and the promotion of its patrimonial interests alongside the regulatory functions, tax collection, sectoral supervision, buyer that the State exercises.

This first step provided the State with a structure embodying and exclusively exercising its role as a shareholder. The second step was to endow the APE with greater autonomy. The appointment of a State Equity Commissioner, reporting directly to the French Ministry of the Economy and Finance, completed the process. Since May 2017, the APE has 88 companies in its portfolio.

Since 2001, the activity of the State shareholder has been traced every year in a report appended to the draft Loi de finances en France (Finance law in France).

=== Operations ===
The main operations carried out by the agency were:

- 2003
  - Merger of Air-France and KLM
  - Transformation of DCN into a public limited company in 2003, which became Naval Group in 2017
- 2004
  - Transformation of France Telecom into a public limited company in 2004, which became Orange in 2006
- 2005
  - Merger between SNECMA and SAGEM, which became Safran in 2005
  - Opening of the capital of EDF with nearly 5 million subscriptions from individuals
  - Initial public offering of Gaz de France and its listing on CAC 40
  - Transformation of ADP into a public limited company
- 2006
  - Opening of the capital and the IPO of Aéroports de Paris in 2006 with 2.6M orders
  - Disposal of Société des autoroutes du Nord et de l'Est de la France, Autoroutes Paris-Rhin-Rhône and Autoroutes du Sud de la France
- 2007
  - Entry of Thales into the capital of DCN
- 2008
  - Merger between Gaz de France and Suez to create the GDF-Suez group which became Engie in 2015
- 2010
  - Merger of the two tunnel boring companies SFTRF and ATMB
  - Transformation of La Poste into a public limited company
- 2012
  - Recapitalization of Dexia
- 2013
  - Takeover of the debt of the EPFR – Établissement public de financement et de restructuration (Public financing and restructuring institution) contracted vis-à-vis Crédit Lyonnais
  - Creation of the Bpifrance (BPI)
- 2014
  - Acquisition of a stake in PSA Peugeot Citroën
  - Acquisition of a stake in Marseille Provence Airport
- 2015
  - Restructuring of the nuclear sector started with EDF, Areva and Orano
  - Restructuring of the land armaments sector with the merger of Nexter and Krauss-Maffei Wegmann to form KNDS
- 2017
  - Merger between Safran and Zodiac Aérospace
  - Provisional nationalization of the Chantiers de l'Atlantique of Saint-Nazaire
- 2018
  - Reform of the public broadcasting
  - New Railway Pact
- 2019
  - Privatization of La Française des Jeux
- 2023
  - Elimination of GIAT Industries from the SNPE-Eurenco structure
- 2024
  - Acquisition of 80% stake in Alcatel Submarine Networks (ASN)

== Goal ==
The four missions of the Agency are as follows: Foster the economic performance of companies, their profitability and their long-term development; Act as a wise shareholder in corporate governance companies; Manage the portfolio of investments through acquisitions, disposals or shareholder mergers; Promote the exemplarity and social and environmental responsibility of companies.

The agency exercises the usual responsibilities of shareholders. In particular, the members of the agency represent the State on the boards of directors. The agency "ensures a sufficient level of control in companies operating in sectors that are particularly sensitive in terms of sovereignty". It enforces political decisions in corporate governance, such as feminization, and executive compensation.

Since 2017, the Agency has revised its shareholder strategy. From now on, the State is intended to be a shareholder in three types of companies: strategic companies which contribute to sovereignty (defense and nuclear), companies participating in public service missions or of national or local general interest for which regulation would be insufficient to preserve public interests and ensure public service missions, companies in difficulty whose disappearance could lead to a systemic risk.

== Direction ==
The successive directors have been:

- Denis Samuel-Lajeunesse appointed general manager of the State participation agency on 15 September 2004
- Bruno Bézard appointed director general of the state participation agency on 26 February 2007
- Jean-Dominique Comolli appointed Commissioner for State Investments on 15 September 2010
- David Azéma appointed Commissioner for State Investments on 1 September 2012
- Régis Turrini appointed Commissioner for State Investments on 1 September 2014
- Martin Vial appointed Commissioner for State Investments on 24 August 2015.

For the performance of its missions, the APE has a tight team of 53 people, mostly civil servants. As of 1 July 2019, it had 27 senior executives and investment managers (General management and investment management) traditionally from engineering bodies (44%), but also, in order to diversify profiles, from other bodies. (30% civil administrators, 33% civil servants from other bodies – INSEE, Banque de France, IGF, Cour des comptes) or contract employees. Nearly 30% of the senior managers of the APE are also graduates of a major business school. The areas of expertise (financial, legal, audit and accounting and communication), support functions and secretariats employ 26 people.

== List of firms ==
Resulting from historical stratification, the entities falling within the scope of APE represent both companies in various sectors (services and finance, energy, transport, industry) and multiple statutes – public limited companies in the majority of cases, but also public institutions of an industrial and commercial nature (établissements publics à caractère industriel et commercial – EPIC).

Company	Direct state ownership	Indirect state ownership	Industry	Products/Services/Activity
Électricité de France (EDF)	100%		energy	electricity
Engie (formerly GDF-Suez)	23.64%		energy	electricity, natural gas
Constellium		10% via Bpifrance	manufacturing, mettalurgy	aluminium production
Vallourec		7.10% via Bpifrance	manufacturing, mettalurgy	automotive parts, stainless steel
Stellantis		6.20% via Bpifrance	manufacturing	automobiles, commercial vehicles
STMicroelectronics		27.60% via Bpifrance	manufacturing	electronics, semiconductors
French Alternative Energies and Atomic Energy Commission (CEA)	100%		defence, manufacturing	design and manufacturing of nuclear reactors and nuclear weapons, electronics
Réseau de Transport d'Électricité (RTE)		100% via CTE	energy	electricity transmission
Areva	100%		energy	nuclear reactor (Olkiluoto 3)
Framatome		75.50% via EDF	energy	nuclear reactors
TechnicAtome	70.60% (20.30% via CEA)	29.30% (20.30% via Naval Group; 9.00% via EDF)	energy	nuclear propulsion, research reactor
Orano	79.90%		mining, energy	nuclear fuel
Eramet		27.13% via FSI-Equation	mining, metallurgy	manganese, nickel, steel alloys
Thales Group	25.70%		electronics	advanced electrical systems
Renault	15.01%		automotive	automobiles, commercial vehicles
Airbus		10.90% via SOGEPA	aerospace, defence	civil and military aircraft, space systems
Safran	11.20%		aerospace, defence	aircraft and rocket engines, missiles, electronics, space systems
Chantiers de l'Atlantique	84.30%	11.70% via Naval Group	shipbuilding	cruise ships, ocean liners, tankers, cargo ships, warships
Office français d'exportation d'armement (ODAS)	100%		defence	advanced weapons systems
Naval Group	62.25%		defence	warships, submarines
Eurenco	100%		defence	chemicals, munitions, explosives
KNDS	50%		defence	artillery, munitions, military vehicles, tanks, defence electronics
Défense Conseil International (DCI)	49.90%		defence	defense advisory, training and operational assistance
France Télévisions	100%		communication	television, radio and online broadcasting
France Médias Monde	100%		communication	television, radio and online broadcasting
Radio France	100%		communication	radio broadcasting
ARTE France	40% (15% via INA)	60% (45% via France Télévisions; 15% via Radio France)	communication	television broadcasting, film
Orange	13.40%	9.60% via Bpifrance	communication	landline and mobile network operations, television service, internet
Alcatel Submarine Networks	80%		communication	submarine cables
La Poste	34%	66% via Caisse des dépôts	communication, transport, finance	mail and parcel services, mobile network operation, banking, insurance
Banque publique d'investissement (Bpifrance)	49.18% via EPIC Bpifrance	49.18% via Caisse des dépôts	finance	SME and startup financing, equity investment, export credit
Dexia	46.81%		finance	banking, insurance
Société de prise de participation de l'Etat (SPPE)	100%		finance	investing in bank securities
Monnaie de Paris	100%		finance	coins, medals
Imprimerie nationale	100%		printing	identification cards, licenses, passports
Rungis International Market	33.34%	18.80% (13.20% via the City of Paris; 5.60% via the Val-de-Marne department)	food	wholesale food
Laboratoire français du fractionnement et des biotechnologies (LFB)	100%		health	blood plasma, medicines
Société pour le logement intermédiaire (SLI)	100%		real estate	intermediate rental housing
Air France-KLM	28.60%		transport	airline services
Aéroports de Paris (ADP)	50.60%		transport	airport operations
Airports of Marseille-Provence, Bordeaux–Mérignac, Montpellier-Méditerranée, Strasbourg-Entzheim, Martinique, Guadelope and Réunion	100%		transport	airport operations
SNCF	100%		transport	inter-city and regional railway services
RATP	100%		transport	metro, bus, tram and regional railway service in Île-de-France
Port complex of Le Havre-Rouen-Paris (HAROPA Port)	100%		transport	port operations
Ports of Marseille-Fos, Dunkirk, Nantes-Saint-Nazaire, La Pallice, Bordeaux, Martinique, Guadelope and Réunion	100%		transport	port operations
Caisse nationale des autoroutes (CNA)	100%		transport, finance	motorway construction financing
Autoroutes et tunnel du Mont-Blanc (ATMB)		67.30% via FDPITMA	transport	motorway tunnel operation
Société française du tunnel routier du Fréjus (SFTRF)		99.90% via FDPITMA	transport	motorway tunnel operation
Française des Jeux (FDJ)	20.46%		gaming	lottery, sports betting
Coentreprise de Transport d'Électricité (CTE)		59.91% (50.01% via EDF; 29.90% via Caisse des dépôts)	holding company	
Société FSI-Equation	100%		holding company	
Societé de Gestion de Participations Aéronautiques (SOGEPA)	100%		holding company	
Fonds pour le Développement d'une Politique Intermodale des Transports dans le Massif Alpin (FDPITMA)	100%		holding company	

== See also ==
- Bpifrance (company)
- Caisse des dépôts et consignations
- Établissement public à caractère industriel et commercial
- Government-owned corporation
