= Nova Indústria Brasil =

Industrial policies developed by Luiz Inácio Lula da Silva

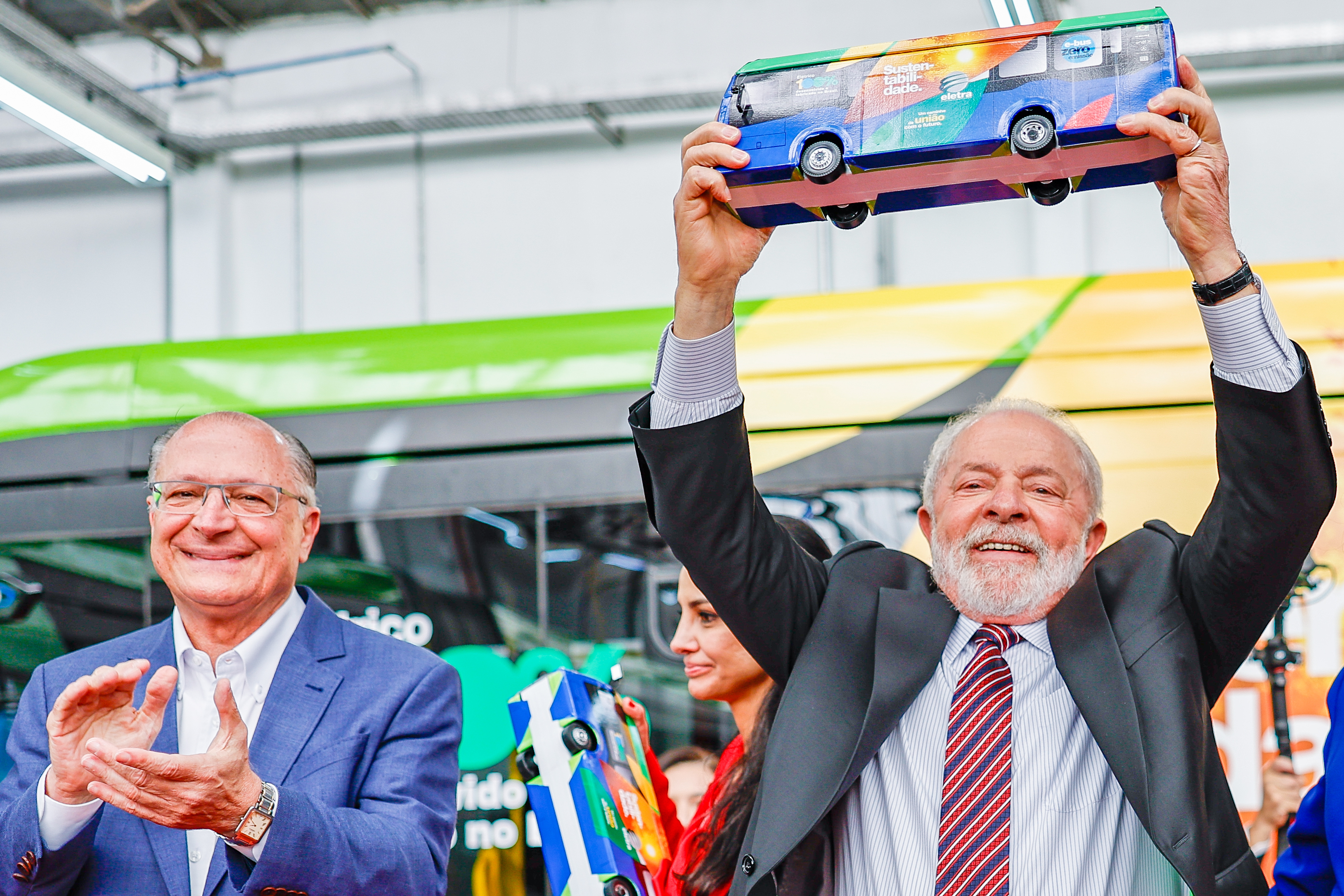
Vice President Geraldo Alckmin and President Lula da Silva inaugurating an electric bus factory in São Bernardo do Campo/SP, June 2023.

Nova Indústria Brasil ("New Industry Brazil", NIB) is the name of the industrial plan and associated policies developed and implemented during Luiz Inácio Lula da Silva's third term as President of Brazil. The plan's goal is to contain the long-standing deindustrialization of Brazil and to create incentives for reindustrialization, which has been referred to as neoindustrialization.

The policy is structured around six foundational areas that should be incentivized, prioritizing certain investments in order to achieve the objectives of the plan before 2033. NIB's main goals are to improve Brazilian self-sufficiency, hasten the energy transition and the modernisation of Brazilian industry, focusing investments into the areas of agriculture, health, infrastructure, information technology, bioeconomy, and national defence.

== Background ==
=== Economic ===
Brazil has been a society built around a primarily agricultural economy since the colonial period. This model was maintained during the Empire of Brazil, with only small investments made in industrial development, such as the investments done by prominent industrialist the Barão de Mauá, and little changed during the First Brazilian Republic in this regard. Only in the 1930s did Brazil begin to engage with industrial development in a consistent and relevant way, during the Vargas era.

Vargas' developmentalist economic policy led to the creation of many factories in heavy industry, spearheaded by the creation of the Companhia Siderúrgica Nacional, a steelmaker. Government intervention and investment in industrial activities made Brazil one of the fastest growing economies in the world during the first half of the 20th century.

The dependence of industrial expansion on importing the relevant equipment from abroad was a limiting factor in industrialising the nation, but Brazil still experienced significant economic growth: in the decade spanning from 1945 to 1955, the Brazilian economy grew on average 6.5% a year, driven by import reduction due to Vargas' policies during the Second World War and the accumulation of vast sums of foreign currency savings, which were wasted by Vargas' successors, particularly exemplified by the massive expansion of foreign imports during Eurico Gaspar Dutra's administration.

Regardless, there were still smaller scale investments in industry that proved effective during the post-Vargas period, such as Juscelino Kubitschek's "Goals Plan" (Plano de Metas) and the Brazilian military dictatorship's First National Development Plan, which, accompanied by vast state-led construction of infrastructure projects, led to the Brazilian economic miracle. This period of growth was halted by the 1973 oil crisis and culminated in the Brazilian "lost decade" of the 1990s, called the Década Perdida.

Thus, Brazil has faced a serious push towards deindustrialisation after the 1980s, when factories began to be closed in the country. Despite only making up 23.9% of the country's GDP, industrial output is the primary exporter of goods and services and investment in R&D. It is also a fundamental element in order to construct an economy less susceptible to random fluctuations in the global market.

== Industrial Policy ==
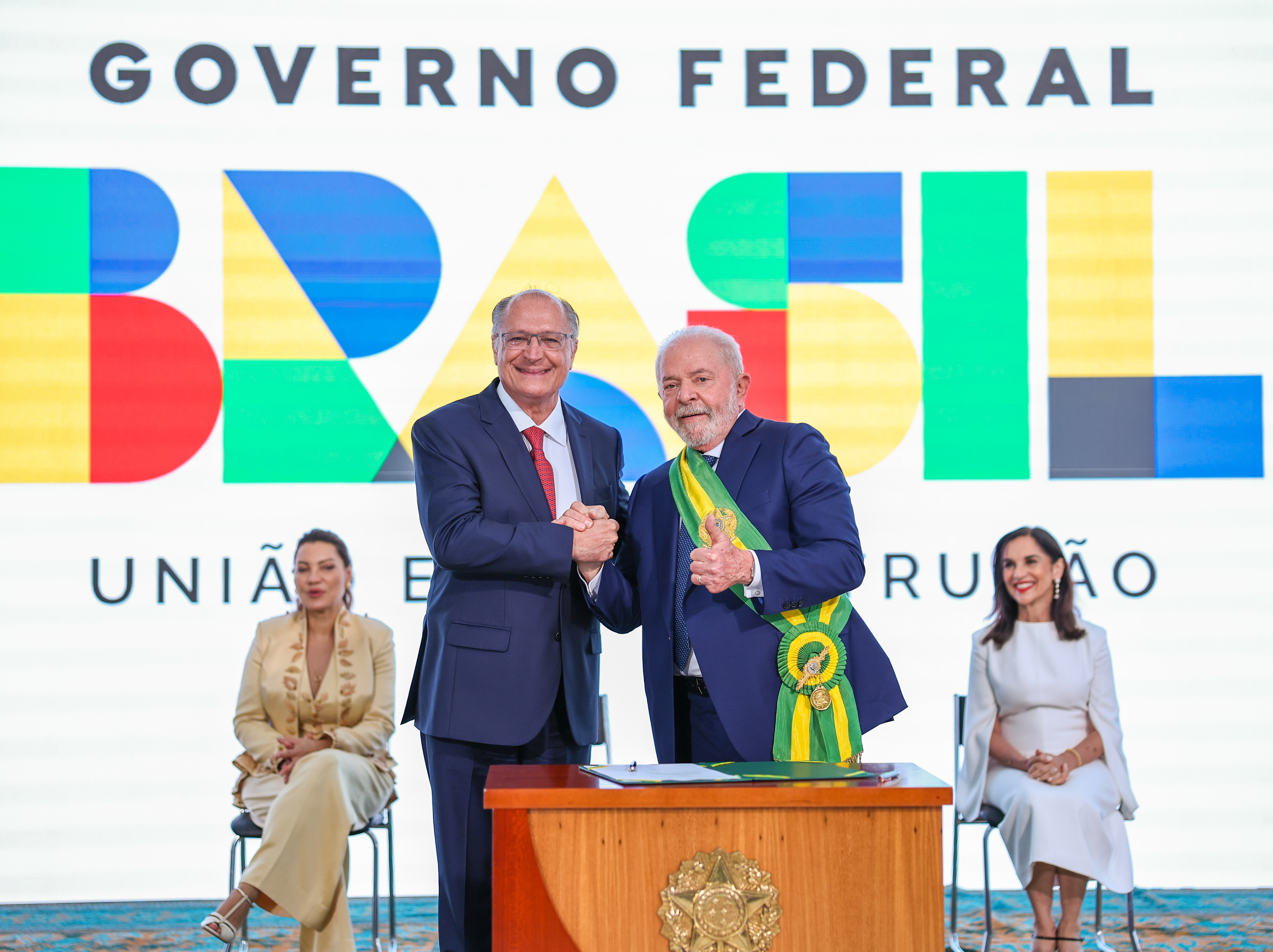
President Lula swearing in Vice President Alckmin as Minister of Development, Industry, Trade, and Services in January 2023.

Since the first half of 2023, the Lula government has been advocating for a plan to reorganize and restructure industrial development, which has been called neoindustrialisation. This task was put under the responsibility of the MDIC (Ministry of Development, Industry, Trade, and Services), headed by Vice-President Geraldo Alckmin, former governor of São Paulo, the most industrialised state in Brazil.
