= Elum Energy =

French solar hybrid power plant software company

- Company type: Private
- Industry: renewable energy
- Founded: 2016
- Founders: Cyril Colin, Karim El Alami
- Headquarters: Paris, France
- Number of employees: 91
- Website: https://elum-energy.com/
- Footnotes / references Total funding: $23.2 million (as of 2024)

Elum Energy is a French software company founded in 2016 in Paris. It makes controllers and SCADA software for solar hybrid power plants, installations that combine photovoltaic panels with battery storage, diesel generators or electric vehicle charging points. By 2025 the company had installed its systems in around 2,800 sites across 90 countries.

== History ==
Cyril Colin and Karim El Alami founded Elum Energy in Paris in 2016. Both had studied at École Polytechnique before going on to the University of California, Berkeley, where they worked on energy systems and watched California's grid shift toward intermittent renewables. Their first installation went in at a factory in Tangier, Morocco.

In 2017 the company took seed money from Kima Ventures and Colin won the Jeune Ingénieur Créateur prize from the Fondation Norbert Ségard, a French engineering foundation. Over the following years the company moved into Sub-Saharan Africa, Latin America and Asia-Pacific, reaching 1,000 commissioned projects by 2023.

In September 2024, Elum Energy raised $13 million in a Series B round led by Energize Capital, a Chicago-based climate-tech fund, with follow-on from Alter Equity and Cota Capital. The following July, the Île-de-France region invested a further €3.5 million through its Fonds Décarbonation, a €150 million vehicle co-financed by Bpifrance, EDF and Crédit Agricole.

== Products ==
The company's hardware line, ePowerControl, is a family of embedded controllers that regulate power flows between the components of a hybrid solar site in real time. Different versions cover grid-tied storage (ES), off-grid microgrids (MC), zero-export installations (ZE) and utility-scale power plant control (PPC). The controllers work with inverters and batteries from most major manufacturers, which PV Magazine described as a competitive advantage over proprietary systems.

ePowerMonitor is a cloud SCADA for remote portfolio management. The technology was tested by laboratories at École Polytechnique and UC Berkeley and was the subject of a patent application.

== Funding ==
Funding history
Date	Round	Amount	Lead investor(s)
July 2017	Seed	Undisclosed	Kima Ventures
Prior to 2024	Intermediate rounds	Undisclosed	Alter Equity, Cota Capital, Greentech Innovation
September 2024	Series B	$13M	Energize Capital
July 2025	Growth	€3.5M	Fonds Île-de-France Décarbonation (Eiffel Investment Group)

PitchBook put total cumulative funding at $23.2 million across 12 investors.
