= French Tech =

French Tech is an accreditation awarded to French cities recognized for their startup ecosystem. It is also a name used by technologically innovative French businesses throughout the world.

Convinced by the necessity to promote the emergence of successful start-ups in France to generate economic value and jobs, the French Government created the French Tech Initiative at the end of 2013. Its philosophy: build on member initiatives of the French Tech themselves, highlight what already exists, and create a snowball effect. It is a shared ambition, propelled by the State but carried and built with all the actors of the French tech company and start-up scene.

The French Tech initiative also has a transversal objective: to enhance the coherence of public actions in favour of startups. It does not create a new organization or a new public tool, but is carried by a small team, Mission French Tech, which works closely with the French Ministry of Economy and Finance, the Ministry of Foreign Affairs and with the General Commissariat for Investment. Its partners, the pillars of the initiative, are national operators, who, under the common banner "French Tech" coordinate their actions in favor of startups: Caisse des Dépôts, Bpifrance and Business France.

Funding from the French Tech Initiative for accelerators (€200 million) and international attractiveness (€15 million) is part of the Investments for the Future program. In this context, the operator is Caisse des Dépôts, which relies on Bpifrance for investment in accelerators and on Business France for international investments.

The French Tech aims to provide a strong common visual identity to French startups as well as to promote entrepreneurial exchanges between them.

== Historic ==
Nine French cities received French Tech accreditation in November 2014 during a first wave of certification.

Cities like Strasbourg, Mulhouse, Nice, Avignon, Angers, Brest and Saint-Étienne preferred to wait to register their candidacies later in 2015.

In January 2015, the French Minister for Digital Affairs Axelle Lemaire announced a budget of €15 million to enhance the attractiveness of the French Tech abroad.

The Banque Publique d'Investissement (Bpifrance) also announced it was investing €200 million in subsidies from 2015. In 2012 alone, Bpifrance invested €700 million.

Axelle Lemaire also announced the establishment of 'French Tech Hubs' in major international cities like Montreal, New York City, London, Berlin, Barcelona, Stockholm, Tokyo, Singapore, Seoul, Shanghai, Taipei, Tel Aviv, São Paulo, Phnom Penh, Cape Town, Abidjan, Moscow and Santiago. Most of which have already opened since February 2014.

In 2016, the movement continued to expand its international reach, notably in international shows and forums. In the United States of America, French startups were part of the largest foreign delegation at the 2016 Consumer Electronics Show (CES) in Las Vegas. 190 French Tech startups were enrolled this year, with a total of 210 French businesses on site. They were the largest European delegation at the 2015 Consumer Electronics Show. In January 2017, the French delegation was the largest foreign delegation again at the Consumer Electronics Show in Las Vegas.

In June 2017, the French Tech national ecosystem has seen the inauguration of world's biggest business incubator, Station F, in Paris. It hosts 1,000 start-ups within 34,000 square meters in the heart of the city.

== Accredited cities ==
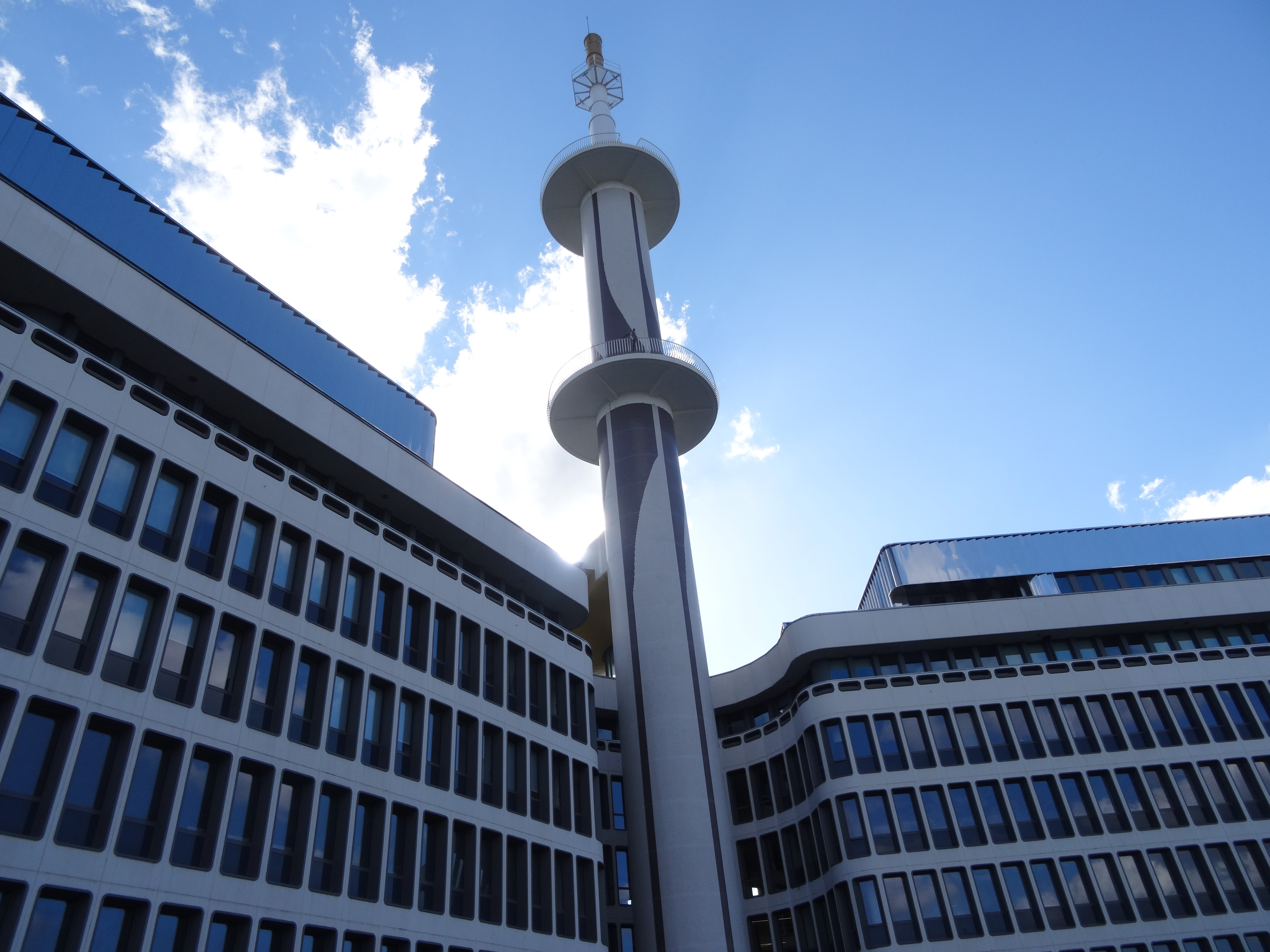
Le Mabilay, HQ of the French Tech Rennes Saint-Malo

In November 2014, nine cities were accredited:

- Aix-Marseille
- Bordeaux
- Grenoble
- Lille
- Lyon
- Montpellier
- Nantes
- Rennes
- Toulouse

In June 2015, four new specialised areas were accredited:

- Brest, with its partners Lannion, Quimper and Morlaix
- Normandy (region), with its cities Rouen, Caen and Le Havre
- Nice, with its partners Sophia Antipolis, Grasse and Cannes
- Lorraine (region), with its cities Metz, Nancy, Épinal and Thionville

To this list are added four thematic cities:

- Saint-Étienne for design ("Design Tech")
- Angers for industry ("Industry Tech")
- Avignon for culture ("Culture Tech")
- Alsace for sciences ("Med Tech" and "Bio Tech")

== French Tech and retail ==
On October 21, 2015, eight major retailers signed a charter to highlight French Tech products on their shelves, at the French Ministry of Economy with Axelle Lemaire, Minister for Digital Affairs. Among those who signed the charter are major players in the retail sector, including Auchan, Boulanger, Carrefour, Darty, Fnac, E.Leclerc, Lick and Orange S.A.

== See also ==
- Station F
- Bpifrance
- Biopôle Clermont-Limagne
