= Livestorm =

- Developer: Livestorm, SAS
- Release: February 2016; 10 years ago
- Written in: Ruby, Ruby on Rails, JavaScript, Vue.js, GraphQL, Go
- Operating system: Web-based
- Available in: 25 languages
- List of languages English, French, German, Portuguese, Spanish, Korean, Russian, Danish, Dutch, Polish, Swedish, Norwegian, Italian, Vietnamese, Arabic, Austrian German, Swiss, Finnish, Greek, Lithuanian, Japanese, Croatian, Slovenian, Czech
- Type: Web conferencing, Video conferencing
- License: Proprietary
- Website: livestorm.co

Livestorm is a software company that provides a browser based online web conferencing software for webinars and virtual meetings.

== History ==
Livestorm was founded in Paris, France in 2016 by Gilles Bertaux, Robin Lambert, Tom Forlini and Vincent Garreau. The company originated as a HETIC school's final-year project. Then called Rumble, the project was later renamed as Livestorm.

In 2019, Livestorm raised a 4.6 million euros series A from public investment bank BPI France, Aglaé Ventures and Raise Ventures.

In February 2020, the COVID-19 pandemic resulted in more companies working remotely, which positively impacted Livestorm's growth. The product usage grew by 30 and its revenue was multiplied by 7.

In November 2020, Livestorm raised a $30 million series B.

In 2021, Livestorm was named among the fastest growing European companies by the Financial Times.

In May 2026, Livestorm made its first acquisition, buying Paris-based AI video startup Qlip AI for an undisclosed sum. Qlip co-founder Pamela Carvallo joined as head of AI, and the company folded the technology into a new video-repurposing tool, Livestorm AI Studio, that turns webinar recordings into short clips.

== Technology ==
Livestorm's core is focused on leveraging WebRTC and WebSocket for real time, low-latency interactions. The video stream quality and format automatically adapts to each viewers' web browser. The stream serves a WebRTC stream for compatible browsers including Google Chrome, Firefox and Opera, with a fall back on HLS on Internet Explorer and Safari.

The frontend runs on the Vue.js framework.

== Products ==
Livestorm provides a video conferencing software for webinars and virtual meetings, with tools for registration pages, email cadences and analytics. A public API service was launched in 2021.

== See also ==
- Comparison of web conferencing software
- Web conferencing
- Collaborative software
