= Cloudwatt =

Cloudwatt was a core initiative of Project Andromède, one of France's periodic attempts at building a local computer industry. Project Andromède was announced in 2009 as a governmental desire for French-controlled cloud computing, with the goal of spending €285 million (US $338 million) in "cloud souverain" ("sovereign cloud" in English).

== Overview ==
The launch of Cloudwatt was a part of the Andromède project initiated in 2009 to promote France in the cloud computing market.

Cloudwatt was established on September 6, 2012 as a subsidiary of Orange S.A., with the government of France and French military contractor Thales as secondary shareholders. Patrick Starck became the CEO of the company.

In 2013, Cloudwatt chose US-based Juniper Networks as a supplier to ensure French data sovereignty. Commercial sales began in 2014, and were expected to reach €500 million per year. The company developed a Dropbox-like storage service targeting small businesses and organizations, which was advertised on TV in 2013.

On March 20, 2015, Orange bought the company out the other investors. On January 1, 2016, Cloudwatt merged with Orange Business Services through its subsidiary Orange Cloud for Business.

Despite government subsidies of €75 million, after two years, the project had revenues of just €6 million. At the end of July 2019, the platform announced to its customers the cessation of its activity, scheduled for January 31, 2020. The users were advised to switch to the Flexible Engine public cloud platform. On February 1, 2020, all services were terminated and clients were advised that their data was deleted.

== Assets ==
Cloudwatt had a capital of 225 million euros with the distribution of funds as follows: 44.4% for Orange, 22.2% for Thales, 33.3% for Caisse des Dépôts.

On January 13, 2015, Orange and its subsidiary Orange cloud for business announced the intention to buy back all of Cloudwatt.

Since March 2015, Orange held 100% of the capital of Cloudwatt.

== See also ==
- Dirigisme
- Plan Calcul
- Minitel
- Quaero
