= Agence de l'innovation industrielle =

French governmental agency

The Agence de l'innovation industrielle was a French governmental agency created in 2005 to support technological projects. As of 2006, it was supporting seven projects:

- BioHub, a chemistry projects to create products with cereals, without using oil
- HOMES, a project of housing with ultra-low use of energy
- Nanosmart, a project of substrate
- Quaero, a search engine
- TVMSL, a project of creating a standard of hybrid terrestrial and satellite mobile television based on DVB-H
- NeoVal, a small automated subway system to replace the VAL
- VHD (Hybrid Diesel Vehicle), which involves PSA Peugeot Citroën.

The agency was headed by Jean-Louis Beffa and Robert Havas. In January 2008, the French government decided to merge the agency with the French small and medium enterprises support public agency, OSEO.
