= Center for Labor and Community Research =

The Center for Labor and Community Research (CLCR) is a 501(c)(3) not-for-profit organization based in Chicago, Illinois.

== History ==
Originally named the Midwest Center for Labor Research, CLCR was founded in 1982 in order to examine the causes and effects of the sharp decline in manufacturing in the 1970s. The goal of CLCR's early research was to determine whether this rapid deindustrialization in the United States was an inevitable consequence of globalization and technological development or whether it was a trend that could be slowed or reversed by effective policy changes.

After almost two decades of in-depth research, CLCR concluded that 80% of losses in manufacturing could have been averted, avoiding much of the subsequent rise in poverty across manufacturing-dependent communities.
