= David Azéma =

French businessman

- Born: 22 November 1960 (age 65); Neuilly-sur-Seine, France
- Education: Lycée Henri-IV; Sciences Po, ÉNA
- Occupation: Businessman

David Azéma (born 22 November 1960) is a French businessman, and a former chairman and chief executive of Eurostar from 1999 to 2002; he worked with the French government's Agence des participations de l'État, and is chairman of Global Infrastructure Group at Bank of America.

== Early life ==
Azéma was born and brought up in Paris. His parents were both university professors. In his teenage years, he thought about becoming a film director.

He attended Lycée Henri-IV in Paris. From the University of Paris, he gained a degree in law. He later studied Politics at Sciences Po. He then trained at the École nationale d'administration (ENA) in Strasbourg, leaving in 1987.

== Career ==
In 1993, Azéma joined the economics department of SNCF.

=== Eurostar ===
Azéma joined Eurostar in March 1999. He became chairman of Eurostar in October 1999, aged 38. The company had been restructured. Eurostar had 31 trains, each costing £24m; they could run on three different electrical power systems and four different signalling systems. At the time, Eurostar had 65% of the London-Paris market.

He resigned from Eurostar Group on 12 June 2002. He was replaced on 4 July 2002 by the current Eurostar chairman Guillaume Pepy, who in 2008 became Chief Executive of SNCF.

Business positions
Preceded by Jean-Dominique Comolli	Chairman of Agence des participations de l'État; 2012-2014	Succeeded by Régis Turrini
Preceded by New company	Chairman of Eurostar International Limited; October 1999-June 2002	Succeeded by Guillaume Pepy
Preceded by	Chief Executive of Eurostar International Limited; October 1999-November 2001	Succeeded by
