= Eurenco =

French explosives manufacturer

- Industry: Arms, Chemical
- Headquarters: France
- Products: Nitrotriazolone
- Website: eurenco.com

Eurenco is an explosives, propellant and military fuels manufacturer based in France. It is a part of the French SOE Agence des Participations de l’Etat. Eurenco has international subsidiaries in Clermont Belgium (formerly part of Poudreries Réunies de Belgique), Karlskoga Sweden and Washington DC, Houston Texas.

== History ==
In 2017, the board approved the investment of a €100 million plant in Sorgues (Vaucluse) to make hexogen explosive. Eurenco already has 250 employees there working to make Nitrotriazolone (NTO) powder. Hexogen is less stable than NTO, and so cannot be characterized as an Extremely Insensitive Detonating Substance nor an Insensitive Munition.

In July 2020, Nexter placed a big artillery shell order with Eurenco.

In April 2023, Eurenco relocated its gunpowder plant from Sweden to France.

In May 2023, Eurenco restarted a nitrocellulose plant in Bergerac.

In July 2023, Eurenco had 1,100 employees and a sales revenue of €300 million.

In October 2023, Eurenco opened an American joint venture subsidiary in Texas.

In March 2024, Emmanuel Macron and Sébastien Lecornu visited the Eurenco plant to decorate employees. At the time, it planned to double its production capacity over two years and forecast sales of €1 billion in 2030. It planned to produce 1,200 metric tonnes per year of gunpowder for 155 mm caliber shells, with an investment of €250 million in France. Some support was from the ASAP programme.
