= Nicolas Dufourcq =

French businessman (born 1963)

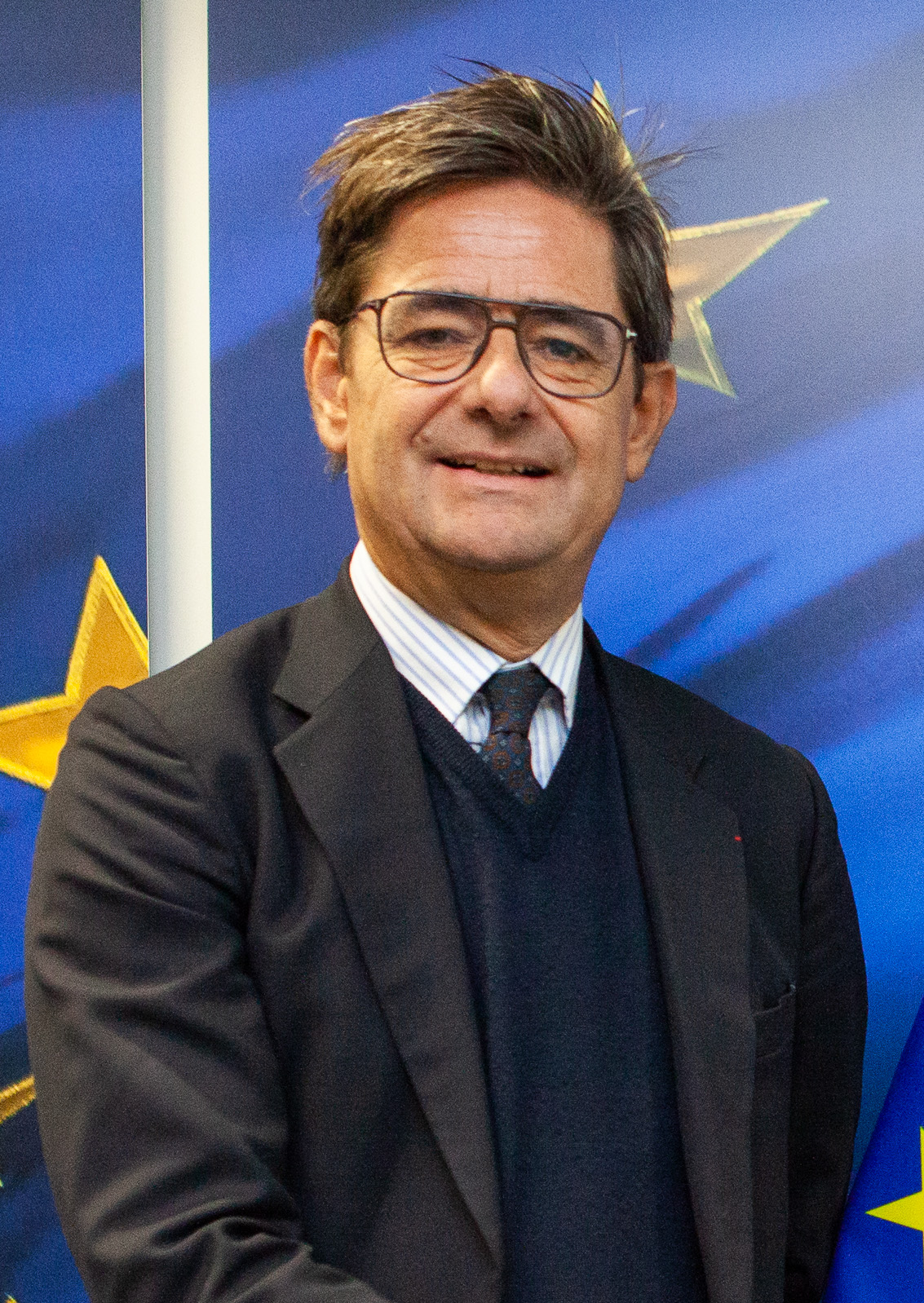
- Dufourcq in 2023
- Born: 18 July 1963 (age 63); Paris, France
- Education: HEC Paris; Sciences Po; École nationale d'administration
- Occupation: Businessman
- Children: 3
- Father: Bertrand Dufourcq
- Relatives: Norbert Dufourcq (grandfather)

Nicolas Georges Norbert Dufourcq (born 18 July 1963) is a French businessman. He has been the general manager of the Banque Publique d’Investissement (Bpifrance) since its creation in January 2013.

== Early life and education ==
Dufourcq was born on 18 July 1963 in Paris. His father, Bertrand Dufourcq (1933–2019), was a diplomat. His mother is Élisabeth Dufourcq (née Lefort des Ylouses), who served as secretary of state research from May to November 1995; she was born in 1940.

Dufourcq graduated from HEC Paris in 1984 and Sciences Po in Paris, he is an alumnus of the National School of Administration (ENA, promotion Michel de Montaigne, 1986–1988) where he received certification as a tax inspector. By the time he was a student at HEC, he had already created five startups.

== Career ==
=== Public sector ===
In 1992, Dufourcq was the deputy chief of staff for René Teulade, who served as minister of social affairs and integration in the government of Prime Minister Pierre Bérégovoy.

Dufourcq returned briefly to finance inspection during 1993-1994 before joining France Télécom. Although he was first special advisor to the managing director, he later became an advisor to President Michel Bon.

=== Private sector ===
Dufourcq continued his career in business as the public audiovisual director for the multimedia division, which he helped create. He was then the director of the multimedia division (1998-2000), executive director of the public internet branch, developed Wanadoo until its stock exchange listing at which point he became CEO (2000-2002). Finally, he became executive director of the telephone and internet industry branch.

In 2003 Dufourcq left France Télécom to join Capgemini, where he held the position as managing director responsible for France, Germany, and central and southern Europe. He was also a member of the company’s executive committee. He became, as of 2004, the assistant general manager of finance, risk management, IT, purchasing, delivery, the LEAN program, and, in 2007, of managing the large accounts of the Capgemini Group. There he began the recovery of the group and the restructuring of its central functions, mainly addressing the redesign of its global information systems. In conjunction, Nicolas Dufourcq is a member of the board of BabelStore SA and of Priceminister, as well as a member of the Supervising Board of Euler Hermes SA.

Dufourcq has been, since the acceptance of his nomination by the Commission of Finances of the National Assembly and of the Senate on 23 January 2013, the managing director of the Public Bank of Investments (Bpifrance). On 15 June 2013 Dufourcq was nominated as president of the administrative counsel of the public institution of Bpifrance by Pierre Moscovici, then the minister of economy and finance. Dufourcq also became the statutory president of OSEO S.A.

He is also the author of a 2013 report (in French) on financing the social economy.

== Other activities ==
- Stellantis, non-executive member of the board of directors (since 2021)
- Doctolib, member of the board of directors (since 2017)
- Orange, member of the board of directors (since 2017)
- STMicroelectronics, member of the board of directors (since 2015)

== Prizes and awards ==
In 2007, Dufourcq was nominated as the “Financial Director of the Year” by Hudson Consulting.

Dufourcq was declared a knight of the Legion of Honour in July 2015.

== Publications ==
Dufourcq wrote:

- 2025, Le Modèle social français
- 2023, La désindustrialisation de la France: 1995-2015

Dufourcq was a member of the collectives that created the following works:

- 1996, L'Argent du Cœur - Hermann (The Heart of Silver)
- 1996, Le Nouvel Age des Inégalités - Seuil (The New Age of Inequalities)
- 1995, Paritarisme et Sécurité Sociale - Fondation Saint-Simon (Joint Management and Social Security)
- 1994, L'Etat Providence Sélectif - Fondation Saint-Simon (The Selective Welfare State)

== Personal life ==
Dufourcq is married to a piano teacher and has three children. In addition to French, he also speaks English and German.

An ardent mountain climber, he completed a month-long excursion in the Himalayas. He also collects violins for himself and other musicians and enjoys classical and most especially electronic music. He is a member of the jury of the Qwartz Electronic Music Awards.

Dufourcq is also the grandson of musicologist, organist, and writer Norbert Dufourcq. Additionally, he is also a descendant of the Prot family, which owned the perfume company Parfums Lubin until 1969.
