= Deindustrialization of Brazil =

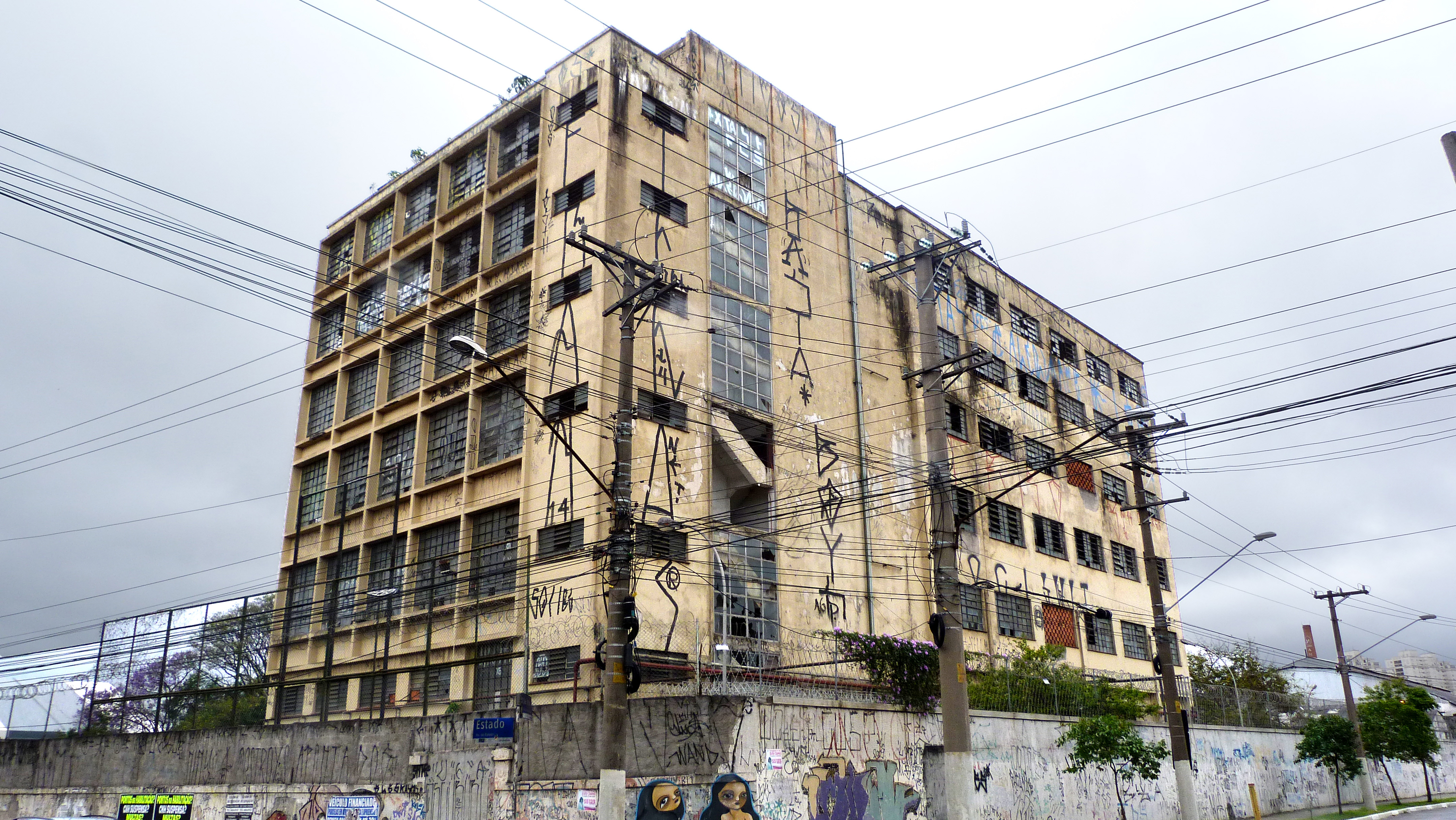
Ruins of the Edifício Companhia Antarctica Paulista, in São Paulo

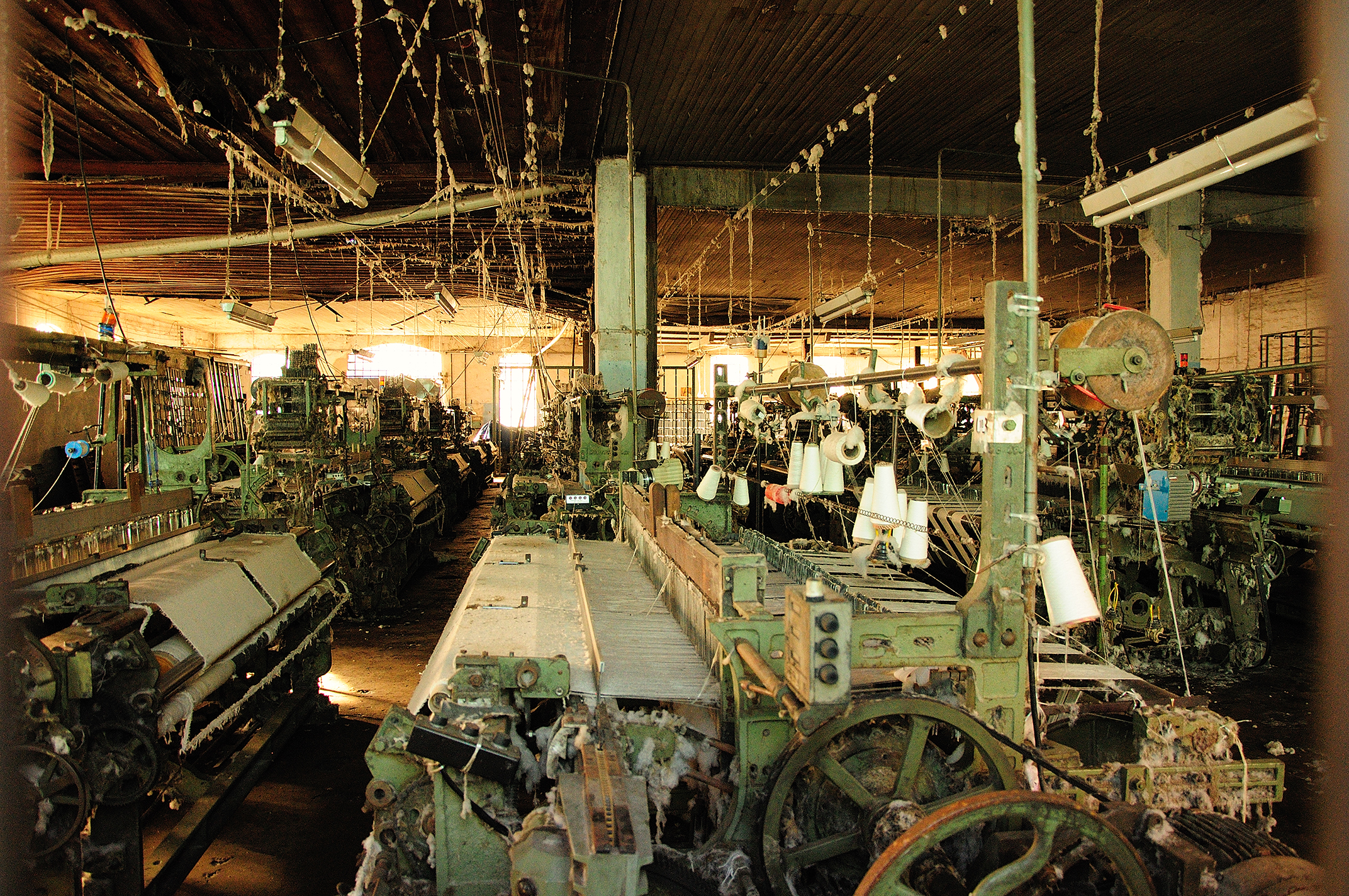
Abandoned weaving factory in the Carioba Industrial Complex, in Americana, São Paulo

The deindustrialization of Brazil was a process of reducing the capacity of Brazilian industry after the 1980s. Between 1930 and 1980, Brazil industrialized and developed rapidly, under a strategy based on import substitution and external debt. Until the 1970s, Brazilian industry was stronger than that of South Korea. After the Latin American debt crisis in the 1980s and the adjustments that stabilized the economy in the following decade, such as the Plano Real, a continuous process of premature deindustrialization devastated the sector, especially the manufacturing industry. Industry, which in 1985 made up half of the Brazilian GDP, in 2020 represented only one fifth, these values being respectively the maximum and minimum of the historical series that began in 1947. The share of industrial employment in relation to total formal employment in 1986 was 27% and fell to 15% in 2019.

== Causes ==
According to the United Nations Conference on Trade and Development (UNCTAD), the set of factors that led to Brazil's deindustrialization occurred throughout Latin America, but Brazil was the most significant case of early industrial dismantling. According to UNCTAD, liberal measures required by the World Bank and the International Monetary Fund (opening of markets, privatization, deregulation, free movement of capital, etc.) as a condition for obtaining loans also had a negative impact on Brazilian and Latin American industries.

Brazilian industry has historically been driven by the import substitution policy and subsidized interest rates (BNDES), but the problems began with the Latin American debt crisis, which began the so-called Década Perdida in the Latin American region. The crisis was especially problematic in the case of Brazil, which had become heavily indebted throughout the industrialization process, especially during the Military Dictatorship. The sudden increase in international interest rates caused a serious economic crisis, which resulted in hyperinflation and eventually culminated in the Plano Real and other reforms. Both the crisis and the way governments dealt with it severely hampered the expansion and profitability of industry during and long after the crisis itself.

Although the Plano Real managed to stabilize the Brazilian economy, some developmentalist economists, such as former Minister of Finance Luiz Carlos Bresser-Pereira, criticize several of the measures adopted by these reforms, in particular the floating exchange rate and the high interest rates imposed by the Central Bank, which are used to control the balance of payments and inflation, but, they claim, negatively affect the competitiveness of national industry.

Bresser-Pereira states that Brazil's exchange rate policy has since been unable to combat one of the main problems facing its industries, which is the tendency of the Brazilian economy to cyclical and chronic overvaluation of the exchange rate, which causes, among other problems, the Dutch disease. The neutralization of this in the domestic market, he says, was previously done through customs tariffs, but these were diluted amid the commercial opening during the Collor government, which is associated with the abandonment of developmental policies, and was succeeded by the use of the overvaluation of the Real, or exchange rate populism, as a tool to combat inflation. An overvalued exchange rate is not competitive, as it is not in industrial equilibrium, which means that even Brazilian industrial companies that use state-of-the-art technology are not competitive in the international market. From 2003 onwards, the commodities boom began, which promoted a recovery in the trade balance, based on the increase in exports, which generated a greater inflow of dollars. There was also a greater inflow of dollars to finance companies linked to the export of primary products, companies linked to domestic consumption and the purchase of public debt securities. This situation prolonged and aggravated the problem of the overvaluation of the Real, and the trade deficit of the industrial sector grew significantly, mainly in sectors with higher technology such as electronics, whose deficit was almost 20 billion dollars in 2010.

Furthermore, the high interest rate policy causes the exchange rate to appreciate in the long term, which is yet another factor that distances it from industrial equilibrium, which, according to Bresser-Pereira, causes companies in the sector to have insufficient profits to save and invest and end up using the little profit they obtain to pay dividends or make financial investments. During Fernando Henrique Cardoso's terms in office, interest rates on public debt remained at a level close to 8% of GDP. During Lula da Silva's terms in office, these percentages were between 6.5 and 6% of GDP, that is, interest rates on public debt were very high for a long period.

Fierce international competition has also been a major challenge for Brazilian industry. Without the support of industrial policies from the State and still having to deal with problems such as an overvalued exchange rate and high interest rates, Brazilian industry has been losing ground both in the domestic and international markets, being forced to compete with others that have the support of aggressive and effective industrial, innovation and technology policies, such as China.

Structural, tax, bureaucratic, logistical and legal challenges, such as poor infrastructure and a cumbersome and complex tax system, weaken Brazilian industry. A study commissioned by industry associations that compared the country with other OECD countries concluded that Brazilian companies pay R$1.5 trillion more to conduct their business.

== Government response and neo-industrialization ==
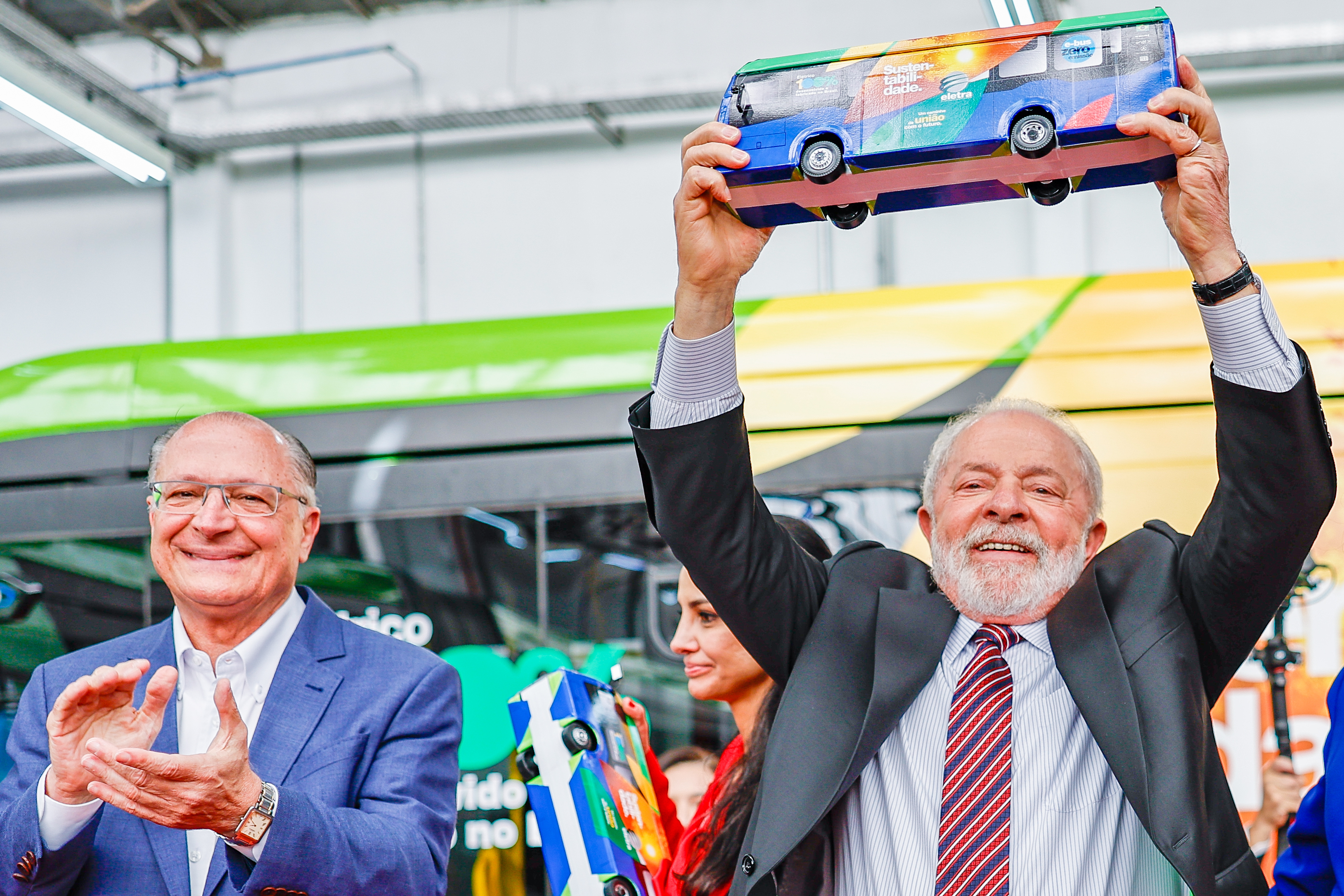
Vice President and Minister of Industry Geraldo Alckmin and President Lula da Silva at the inauguration of an electric bus factory in São Bernardo do Campo, São Paulo, in June 2023.

Lula da Silva's victory in the 2022 elections and the recreation of the Ministry of Development, Industry, Trade and Services, under a government plan influenced by the national-developmentalism (adapted to fiscal austerity policies and with international sustainability standards), made it possible for a project to combat the deindustrialization that had worsened after the COVID-19 pandemic. This reindustrialization process was called neo-industrialization by scholars and politicians.

The project, called Nova Indústria Brasil (lit. 'New Industry Brazil', NIB) is structured into six missions that are the actions to be promoted by the new industrial policy and they have priority areas for investments aiming to achieve the goals stipulated by 2033. The NIB seeks to expand autonomy, ecological transition and modernization of the Brazilian industrial park, directing investments to agroindustry, health, urban infrastructure, information technology, bioeconomy and defense.

For critics, the plan is a rehash of unsuccessful proposals from previous Workers' Party governments, particularly those implemented during the administration of President Dilma Rousseff, which had no lasting effect after the end of subsidies and protectionism.

== See also ==
- Deindustrialization
- Industry in Brazil
- Década Perdida
- 2014 Brazilian economic crisis
