= LTU Technologies =

LTU technologies, Inc.
- Type: Subsidiary of JASTEC International, Inc.
- Industry: computer software
- Founded: 1999
- Headquarters: Paris
- Key people: Noboru Nakatani, chairman
- Products: LTU Engine; LTU Cloud
- Website: www.ltutech.com

Founded in 1999, LTU technologies is a company in the field of image recognition for commercial and government customers. The company provides technologies for image matching, similarity and color search for integration into applications for mobile, media intelligence and advertisement tracking, ecommerce and stock photography, brand and copyright protection, law enforcement and more.

LTU's patented technology originated in academic research at MIT, Oxford University and INRIA.

In 2005 LTU was acquired by JASTEC International, Inc., based in New York City.
