= SOGEPA =

French holding company

SOGEPA (Societé de Gestion de Participations Aéronautiques) is a French holding company owned completely by the French Republic. It is one of the largest public bodies investing in European aerospace technology, indirectly owning 10.09% shares of Airbus as of 31 September 2023.

It was under supervision of Agence des participations de l'État.

In 2014, SOGEPA became one of the major shareholders of PSA Peugeot Citroën (now Stellantis).
