= Deindustrialization =

Process of reduction of industrial activity

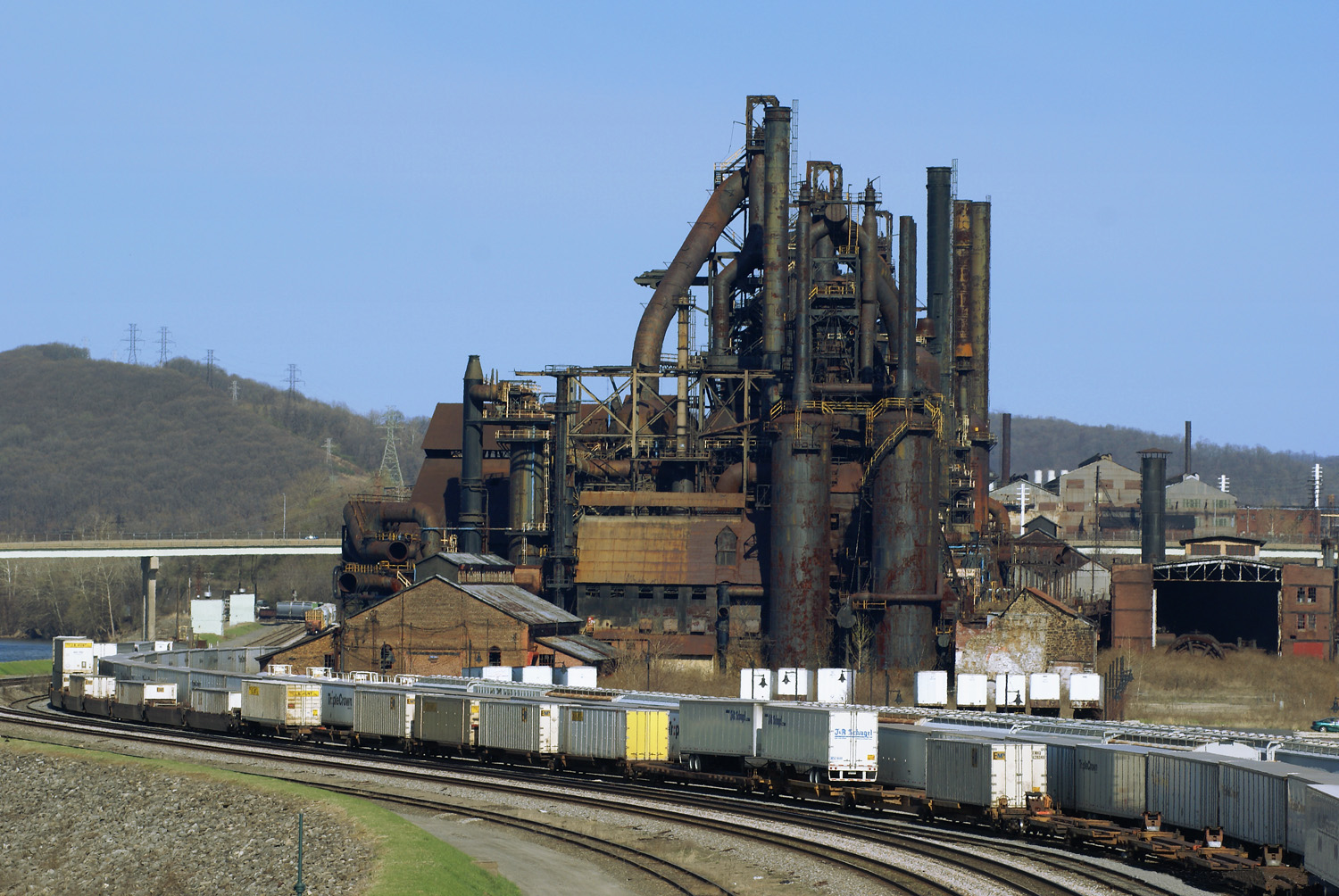
Bethlehem Steel in Bethlehem, Pennsylvania, one of the world's leading steel manufacturers for most of the 20th century, discontinued most of its operations in 1982, filed for bankruptcy in 2001, and was dissolved in 2003.

Deindustrialization is a process of social and economic change caused by the removal or reduction of industrial capacity or activity in a country or region, especially of heavy industry or manufacturing industry.

Research has pointed to investment in patents rather than in new capital equipment as a contributing factor. At a more fundamental level, Cairncross and Lever offer four possible definitions of deindustrialization:

1. A straightforward long-term decline in the output of manufactured goods or in employment in the manufacturing sector.
2. A shift from manufacturing to the service sectors, so that manufacturing has a lower share of total employment. Such a shift may occur even if manufacturing employment is growing in absolute terms
3. That manufactured goods comprise a declining share of external trade, so that there is a progressive failure to achieve a sufficient surplus of exports over imports to maintain an economy in external balance
4. A continuing state of balance of trade deficit (as described in the third definition above) that accumulates to the extent that a country or region is unable to pay for necessary imports to sustain further production of goods, thus initiating a further downward spiral of economic decline.

== Deindustrialization crisis ==
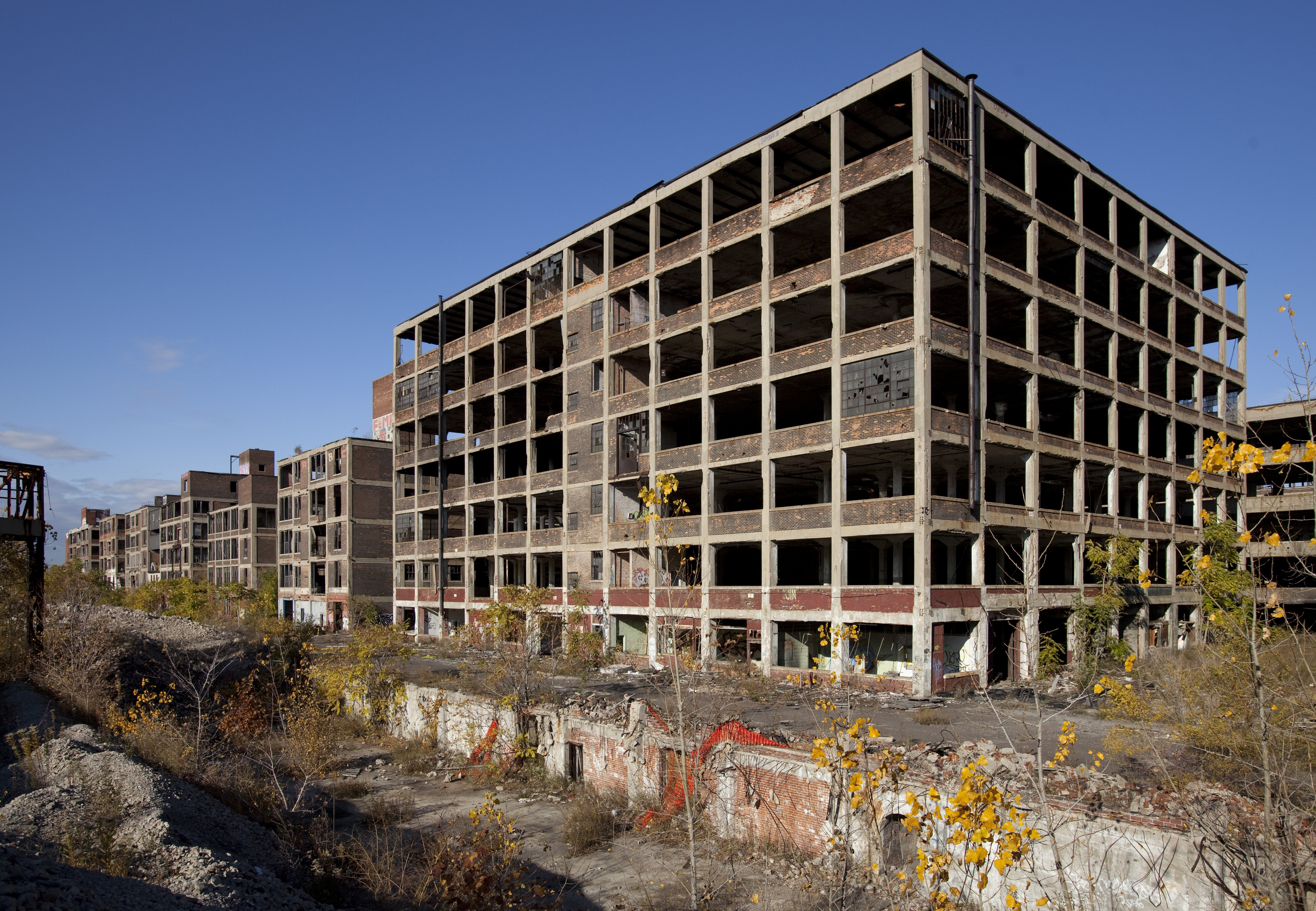
The former Packard Automotive Plant in Detroit, a recognizable symbol of the decline of the city's once vibrant automotive industry

The term deindustrialization crisis has been used to describe the decline of labor-intensive industry in a number of countries and flight of jobs away from cities. One example is labor-intensive manufacturing. After free-trade agreements were instituted with less developed nations in the 1980s and 1990s, labor-intensive manufacturers relocated production facilities to third world countries with much lower wages and lower standards. In addition, technological inventions that required less manual labor, such as industrial robots, eliminated many manufacturing jobs.

== Explanations ==
Rowthorn and Wells distinguish between deindustrialization explanations that see it as a positive process of, for example, maturity of the economy, and those that associate deindustrialization with negative factors like bad economic performance. They suggest deindustrialization may be both an effect and a cause of poor economic performance.

=== Automation ===
Pitelis and Antonakis suggest that, to the extent that manufacturing is characterized by higher productivity, this leads, all other things being equal, to a reduction in relative cost of manufacturing products, thus a reduction in the relative share of manufacturing (provided manufacturing and services are characterized by relatively inelastic demand). Moreover, to the extent that manufacturing firms downsize through, e.g., outsourcing, contracting out, etc., this reduces manufacturing share without negatively influencing the economy. Indeed, it potentially has positive effects, provided such actions increase firm productivity and performance.

=== Inflation ===
George Reisman identified inflation as a contributor to deindustrialization. In his analysis, the process of fiat money inflation distorts the economic calculations necessary to operate capital-intensive manufacturing enterprises, and makes the investments necessary for sustaining the operations of such enterprises unprofitable.

=== Offshoring and outsourcing ===
Institutional arrangements have also contributed to deindustrialization such as economic restructuring. With breakthroughs in transportation, communication and information technology, a globalized economy that encouraged foreign direct investment, capital mobility and labor migration, and new economic theory's emphasis on specialized factor endowments, manufacturing moved to lower-cost sites and in its place service sector and financial agglomerations concentrated in urban areas.

=== Preferences ===
A study covering advanced economies between 1995 and 2014, shows that the shrinking share of manufacturing value added in GDP was mainly driven by relative price movements and by shifts in final demand. Services became relatively more expensive than manufactured goods, so manufacturing’s share in GDP fell for largely nominal reasons. At the same time, services behaved as superior goods, with consumption rising faster than income growth, while the demand for manufactured goods increased more slowly; this theory is referenced as a result of Engel's law. Other factors, such as technological changes in input use or shifts in trade patterns, played only a minor role in the observed decline.

=== Other ===
Robert Rowthorn, a University of Cambridge professor of economics, argues that Karl Marx's theory of declining industrial profit may be regarded as one of the earliest explanations of deindustrialization. This theory argues that technological innovation enables more efficient means of production, results in increased physical productivity, including a greater output of use value per unit of capital invested. In parallel, however, technological innovations replace people with machinery, and the organic composition of capital decreases. Assuming only labor can produce new additional value, this greater physical output embodies a smaller surplus value. The average rate of industrial profit therefore declines in the longer term.

== See also ==
- Baumol effect
- Brownfield land
- Center for Labor and Community Research
- Comparative advantage
- Deindustrialisation by country
- Dutch disease
- Industrialization
  - Great Divergence
  - Textile manufacture during the British Industrial Revolution
- Industrial Revolution
  - Industrial Revolution in the United States
- Jobless recovery
- Mechanization
- Newly industrialized country
- Post-industrial society
- Reindustrialization
- Rust Belt
- Urban decay
