= Défense Conseil International =

Défense Conseil International (DCI)
- Industry: engineering, technical studies
- Founded: 2000
- Headquarters: Paris, France
- Key people: Jean-Michel Palagos Chairman & CEO
- Products: Defense; Security; Advising; Training; Tactical; operational assistance
- Revenue: 227,6M€ (2016)
- Owners: French State 55.5%; SOFEMA 33.3%; Eurotradia International 11.1%
- Number of employees: 1079 (1 June 2017)
- Website: www.groupedci.com

The Défense Conseil International is the French Ministry of Armed Forces' operator for exporting French military knowledge, training and technical assistance internationally. The organisation is a merger of 4 predecessors – COFRAS (established in 1972), NAFVCO (1980 now Naval Group), AIRCO (1984) and DESCO (1990). The four companies were once part of four branches of the French army (Land, Navy, Air and Special Forces, respectively) before unification in 2000.

The DCI group is headquartered in Paris, with several other sites within France. The company also has locations abroad, notably in the Middle East.

== See also ==
- French Armed Forces
- Dassault
