= Bpifrance =

French bank

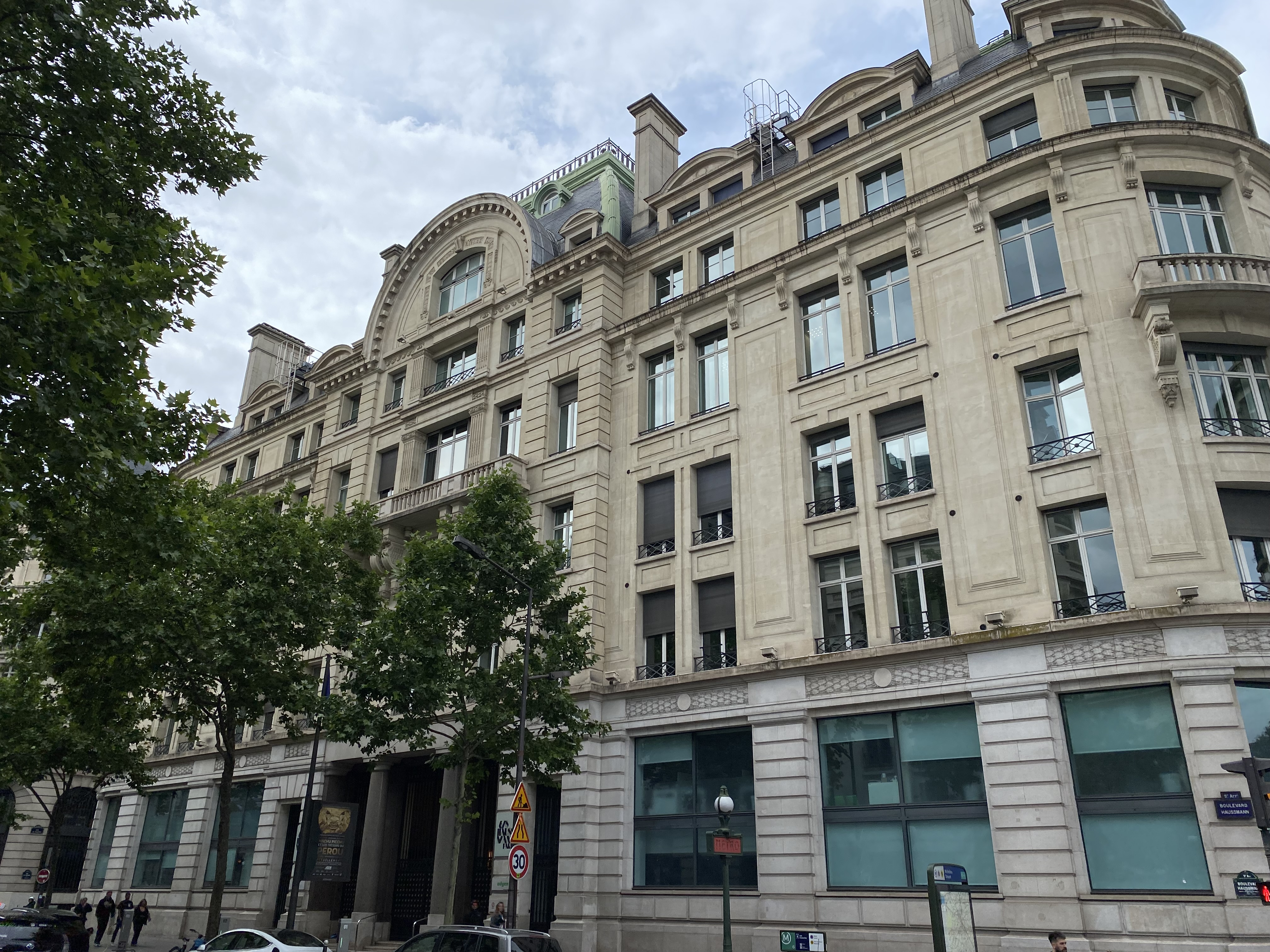
- Former head office building of Banque de l'Union Parisienne at 6–8, boulevard Haussmann in Paris, now downtown Paris office of Bpifrance
- Native name: Banque publique d'investissement S.A. (French)
- Type: Société anonyme
- Founded: 2012; 14 years ago
- Headquarters: 27/31, avenue du Général Leclerc, Maisons-Alfort, France
- Key people: Nicolas Dufourcq (general manager)
- Revenue: €1.444 billion (2018)
- Operating income: €1.019 billion (2018)
- Net income: ▼€1.566 billion (2022)
- Total assets: ▲€101.7 billion (2022)
- Total equity: ▼€27.503 billion (2022)
- Owner: Caisse des dépôts et consignations (50%); EPIC Bpifrance (50%)
- Number of employees: 2,289
- Subsidiaries: bpifrance investissement bpifrance participations bpifrance régions bpifrance financement bpifrance assurance export
- Website: www.bpifrance.fr

Bpifrance also known as the Banque publique d'investissement (lit. '[French] Public Investment Bank') is a French public sector investment bank. It is a joint venture of two state owned enterprises: the Caisse des dépôts et consignations and EPIC Bpifrance Group (formerly EPIC OSEO).

The former subsidiary of EPIC OSEO, OSEO S.A., became a subsidiary of Bpifrance known as Bpifrance Financement.

Bpifrance has been designated as a Significant Institution since the entry into force of European Banking Supervision in late 2014, and as a consequence is directly supervised by the European Central Bank.

== History ==
Bpifrance was established in 2012 as part of a broader effort by the French government to consolidate public financial support for businesses. It brought together three major state-backed bodies: OSEO, which focused on loans and guarantees for small and medium-sized enterprises; the Fonds Stratégique d’Investissement (FSI), created in 2008 to support long-term strategic equity holdings; and CDC Entreprises, the venture capital subsidiary of the Caisse des Dépôts et Consignations.

The new institution became operational in 2013, offering a unified structure for loans, guarantees, equity investments, and export financing. In 2015, Bpifrance expanded its mandate to include innovation funding and support for international business development. In 2017, it launched “Bpifrance Export” to streamline export insurance and trade promotion services, previously managed by Coface.

During the COVID-19 pandemic in 2020, Bpifrance played a central role in the French government's economic response by providing state-guaranteed loans to businesses affected by the crisis. In the following years, the institution increased its involvement in strategic sectors such as renewable energy, biotechnology, and industrial decarbonization.

In 2024, Bpifrance provided export credit support for a £5 billion loan arranged by a consortium of 13 commercial banks to finance the construction of the Sizewell C nuclear power station in the United Kingdom.

In early 2026, Bpifrance reached a significant financial milestone by becoming the first French bank to issue an inaugural "European Green Bond" (EuGB), raising €1 billion with a maturity date of 2036 to fund ecological transition projects. This was followed in April 2026 by a targeted investment in the digital health sector, where the bank’s Digital Prevention Fund co-led a €4 million Series A funding round for Axomove, a Lille-based health-tech startup specializing in musculoskeletal rehabilitation.

It is a member of the International Forum of Sovereign Wealth Funds.

== Subsidiaries and minority interests ==
- Bpifrance Financement S.A. (90%) (ex-OSEO S.A.)
  - Bpifrance Régions (99%)
- Bpifrance Participations (100%) (ex-Fonds stratégique d'investissement)
  - Bpifrance Investissement (100%) (ex-CDC Entreprises)
  - Orange S.A. (shared with APE as the largest shareholders (23.04%); the rest publicly floats)
  - FT1CI (79.2%, the rest owned by another French agency CEA)
    - STMicroelectronics Holding (50%; joint venture with Italian government)
      - STMicroelectronics (27.6% as the largest shareholders; the rest publicly floats)
- Vallourec (7.10% as largest shareholders)
- Stellantis (6.2%)
- Constellium (10%)

== See also ==
- Agence des participations de l'État
- List of banks in France
- List of banks in the euro area
- List of national development banks
