= Bpifrance (public entity) =

EPIC Bpifrance Group
- Formerly: EPIC OSEO
- Company type: Établissement public à caractère industriel et commercial
- Industry: public administration (supervision) of economic activities
- Founded: 2005
- Headquarters: Paris, France
- Key people: Michel Colin (chairman)
- Net income: ▲€525 million (2014)
- Total assets: ▲€17.441 billion (2014)
- Total equity: ▲€10.571 billion (2014)
- Owner: Government of France
- Subsidiaries: Banque Publique d'Investissement S.A. (50%)
- Website: Official website (in French)

EPIC Bpifrance Group (BPI is the acronym of Banque Publique d'Investissement) is a French government agency, previously known as EPIC OSEO. In 2013, the French government reorganized their sovereign funds. OSEO's subsidiary, OSEO S.A., was merged with Fonds stratégique d'investissement and Caisse des dépôts et consignations's CDC Entreprises to form Banque Publique d'Investissement S.A. (BPI, or Bpifrance).

== History ==
EPIC OSEO was formed in 2005 by the merger of Agence nationale de valorisation de la recherche, the BDPME (Banque du Développement des PME) and BDPME's subsidiary Sofaris (Société française de garantie des financements des PME).

In 2008, Agence de l'innovation industrielle was absorbed.

In 2010, the subsidiaries of OSEO, OSEO Innovation, OSEO Financement and OSEO Garantie were merged to form OSEO S.A.

In 2012–13 OSEO S.A. was merged with Fonds stratégique d'investissement and Caisse des dépôts et consignations's CDC Entreprises to form Banque Publique d'Investissement S.A. (BPI or Bpifrance). At the same time EPIC OESO was renamed to EPIC BPI-Groupe (literally Public entity for Industrial and Commercial, Public Investment Bank Group)
